

556001–556100 

|-bgcolor=#d6d6d6
| 556001 ||  || — || October 21, 2011 || Mount Lemmon || Mount Lemmon Survey ||  || align=right | 2.8 km || 
|-id=002 bgcolor=#fefefe
| 556002 ||  || — || March 14, 2010 || Mount Lemmon || Mount Lemmon Survey ||  || align=right data-sort-value="0.68" | 680 m || 
|-id=003 bgcolor=#fefefe
| 556003 ||  || — || March 28, 2014 || Haleakala || Pan-STARRS ||  || align=right data-sort-value="0.88" | 880 m || 
|-id=004 bgcolor=#C2E0FF
| 556004 ||  || — || April 16, 2012 || Haleakala || Pan-STARRS || SDOcritical || align=right | 495 km || 
|-id=005 bgcolor=#fefefe
| 556005 ||  || — || March 12, 2010 || Kitt Peak || Spacewatch ||  || align=right data-sort-value="0.63" | 630 m || 
|-id=006 bgcolor=#fefefe
| 556006 ||  || — || April 28, 2003 || Kitt Peak || Spacewatch ||  || align=right data-sort-value="0.60" | 600 m || 
|-id=007 bgcolor=#fefefe
| 556007 ||  || — || August 23, 2004 || Kitt Peak || Spacewatch ||  || align=right data-sort-value="0.61" | 610 m || 
|-id=008 bgcolor=#fefefe
| 556008 ||  || — || April 29, 2014 || Haleakala || Pan-STARRS ||  || align=right data-sort-value="0.73" | 730 m || 
|-id=009 bgcolor=#d6d6d6
| 556009 ||  || — || April 29, 2014 || Haleakala || Pan-STARRS ||  || align=right | 1.8 km || 
|-id=010 bgcolor=#fefefe
| 556010 ||  || — || July 26, 2001 || Palomar || NEAT ||  || align=right data-sort-value="0.83" | 830 m || 
|-id=011 bgcolor=#fefefe
| 556011 ||  || — || September 25, 2012 || Mount Lemmon || Mount Lemmon Survey || NYS || align=right data-sort-value="0.53" | 530 m || 
|-id=012 bgcolor=#fefefe
| 556012 ||  || — || August 27, 2011 || Haleakala || Pan-STARRS ||  || align=right data-sort-value="0.70" | 700 m || 
|-id=013 bgcolor=#fefefe
| 556013 ||  || — || May 2, 2014 || Kitt Peak || Spacewatch ||  || align=right data-sort-value="0.64" | 640 m || 
|-id=014 bgcolor=#fefefe
| 556014 ||  || — || April 29, 2014 || ESA OGS || ESA OGS ||  || align=right data-sort-value="0.78" | 780 m || 
|-id=015 bgcolor=#fefefe
| 556015 ||  || — || January 14, 2013 || Mount Lemmon || Mount Lemmon Survey ||  || align=right data-sort-value="0.84" | 840 m || 
|-id=016 bgcolor=#fefefe
| 556016 ||  || — || February 9, 2010 || Kitt Peak || Spacewatch || NYS || align=right data-sort-value="0.54" | 540 m || 
|-id=017 bgcolor=#fefefe
| 556017 ||  || — || September 5, 2007 || Mount Lemmon || Mount Lemmon Survey || NYS || align=right data-sort-value="0.52" | 520 m || 
|-id=018 bgcolor=#fefefe
| 556018 ||  || — || March 23, 2003 || Apache Point || SDSS Collaboration ||  || align=right data-sort-value="0.79" | 790 m || 
|-id=019 bgcolor=#E9E9E9
| 556019 ||  || — || December 23, 2012 || Haleakala || Pan-STARRS ||  || align=right | 1.0 km || 
|-id=020 bgcolor=#fefefe
| 556020 ||  || — || January 21, 2002 || Kitt Peak || Spacewatch ||  || align=right | 1.1 km || 
|-id=021 bgcolor=#fefefe
| 556021 ||  || — || November 24, 2012 || Kitt Peak || Spacewatch ||  || align=right data-sort-value="0.66" | 660 m || 
|-id=022 bgcolor=#fefefe
| 556022 ||  || — || September 16, 2012 || Mount Lemmon || Mount Lemmon Survey ||  || align=right data-sort-value="0.76" | 760 m || 
|-id=023 bgcolor=#fefefe
| 556023 ||  || — || July 28, 2011 || Siding Spring || SSS ||  || align=right data-sort-value="0.62" | 620 m || 
|-id=024 bgcolor=#fefefe
| 556024 ||  || — || May 13, 2007 || Kitt Peak || Spacewatch ||  || align=right data-sort-value="0.64" | 640 m || 
|-id=025 bgcolor=#fefefe
| 556025 ||  || — || March 25, 2014 || Kitt Peak || Spacewatch ||  || align=right data-sort-value="0.60" | 600 m || 
|-id=026 bgcolor=#fefefe
| 556026 ||  || — || December 28, 2005 || Kitt Peak || Spacewatch ||  || align=right data-sort-value="0.90" | 900 m || 
|-id=027 bgcolor=#fefefe
| 556027 ||  || — || July 29, 2000 || Cerro Tololo || M. W. Buie, S. D. Kern || MAS || align=right data-sort-value="0.88" | 880 m || 
|-id=028 bgcolor=#fefefe
| 556028 ||  || — || December 5, 2005 || Mount Lemmon || Mount Lemmon Survey ||  || align=right data-sort-value="0.78" | 780 m || 
|-id=029 bgcolor=#E9E9E9
| 556029 ||  || — || December 5, 2007 || Mount Lemmon || Mount Lemmon Survey ||  || align=right | 1.5 km || 
|-id=030 bgcolor=#E9E9E9
| 556030 ||  || — || May 5, 2014 || Mount Lemmon || Mount Lemmon Survey ||  || align=right data-sort-value="0.95" | 950 m || 
|-id=031 bgcolor=#fefefe
| 556031 ||  || — || April 29, 2014 || Haleakala || Pan-STARRS ||  || align=right data-sort-value="0.75" | 750 m || 
|-id=032 bgcolor=#fefefe
| 556032 ||  || — || January 31, 2006 || Catalina || CSS ||  || align=right data-sort-value="0.94" | 940 m || 
|-id=033 bgcolor=#fefefe
| 556033 ||  || — || November 30, 2005 || Mount Lemmon || Mount Lemmon Survey ||  || align=right data-sort-value="0.69" | 690 m || 
|-id=034 bgcolor=#fefefe
| 556034 ||  || — || April 10, 2000 || Kitt Peak || Kitt Peak Obs. ||  || align=right data-sort-value="0.85" | 850 m || 
|-id=035 bgcolor=#fefefe
| 556035 ||  || — || September 23, 2011 || Haleakala || Pan-STARRS || NYS || align=right data-sort-value="0.58" | 580 m || 
|-id=036 bgcolor=#fefefe
| 556036 ||  || — || April 24, 2003 || Kitt Peak || Spacewatch ||  || align=right data-sort-value="0.64" | 640 m || 
|-id=037 bgcolor=#fefefe
| 556037 ||  || — || May 4, 2014 || Haleakala || Pan-STARRS ||  || align=right data-sort-value="0.70" | 700 m || 
|-id=038 bgcolor=#fefefe
| 556038 ||  || — || June 12, 2007 || Kitt Peak || Spacewatch ||  || align=right data-sort-value="0.51" | 510 m || 
|-id=039 bgcolor=#fefefe
| 556039 ||  || — || November 7, 2005 || Mauna Kea || Mauna Kea Obs. ||  || align=right data-sort-value="0.65" | 650 m || 
|-id=040 bgcolor=#fefefe
| 556040 ||  || — || June 11, 2004 || Kitt Peak || Spacewatch ||  || align=right data-sort-value="0.43" | 430 m || 
|-id=041 bgcolor=#fefefe
| 556041 ||  || — || April 5, 2014 || Haleakala || Pan-STARRS ||  || align=right data-sort-value="0.59" | 590 m || 
|-id=042 bgcolor=#fefefe
| 556042 ||  || — || September 19, 2011 || Haleakala || Pan-STARRS ||  || align=right data-sort-value="0.69" | 690 m || 
|-id=043 bgcolor=#fefefe
| 556043 ||  || — || May 3, 2014 || Mount Lemmon || Mount Lemmon Survey ||  || align=right data-sort-value="0.64" | 640 m || 
|-id=044 bgcolor=#fefefe
| 556044 ||  || — || March 4, 2006 || Kitt Peak || Spacewatch ||  || align=right | 1.1 km || 
|-id=045 bgcolor=#FA8072
| 556045 ||  || — || May 5, 2003 || Kitt Peak || Spacewatch ||  || align=right data-sort-value="0.67" | 670 m || 
|-id=046 bgcolor=#fefefe
| 556046 ||  || — || April 8, 2014 || Haleakala || Pan-STARRS || H || align=right data-sort-value="0.54" | 540 m || 
|-id=047 bgcolor=#fefefe
| 556047 ||  || — || May 12, 2007 || Mount Lemmon || Mount Lemmon Survey ||  || align=right data-sort-value="0.60" | 600 m || 
|-id=048 bgcolor=#fefefe
| 556048 ||  || — || May 4, 2014 || Haleakala || Pan-STARRS ||  || align=right data-sort-value="0.62" | 620 m || 
|-id=049 bgcolor=#fefefe
| 556049 ||  || — || January 24, 2006 || Kitt Peak || Spacewatch ||  || align=right data-sort-value="0.62" | 620 m || 
|-id=050 bgcolor=#fefefe
| 556050 ||  || — || September 17, 2003 || Kitt Peak || Spacewatch ||  || align=right data-sort-value="0.77" | 770 m || 
|-id=051 bgcolor=#fefefe
| 556051 ||  || — || February 28, 2014 || Haleakala || Pan-STARRS ||  || align=right data-sort-value="0.82" | 820 m || 
|-id=052 bgcolor=#fefefe
| 556052 ||  || — || September 29, 2011 || Mount Lemmon || Mount Lemmon Survey ||  || align=right data-sort-value="0.70" | 700 m || 
|-id=053 bgcolor=#fefefe
| 556053 ||  || — || February 10, 2010 || Kitt Peak || Spacewatch || NYS || align=right data-sort-value="0.48" | 480 m || 
|-id=054 bgcolor=#fefefe
| 556054 ||  || — || December 3, 2008 || Kitt Peak || Spacewatch ||  || align=right data-sort-value="0.80" | 800 m || 
|-id=055 bgcolor=#fefefe
| 556055 ||  || — || September 24, 2011 || Haleakala || Pan-STARRS ||  || align=right data-sort-value="0.62" | 620 m || 
|-id=056 bgcolor=#fefefe
| 556056 ||  || — || September 4, 2004 || Palomar || NEAT ||  || align=right data-sort-value="0.89" | 890 m || 
|-id=057 bgcolor=#fefefe
| 556057 ||  || — || February 25, 2006 || Kitt Peak || Spacewatch ||  || align=right data-sort-value="0.67" | 670 m || 
|-id=058 bgcolor=#fefefe
| 556058 ||  || — || May 3, 2014 || Mount Lemmon || Mount Lemmon Survey ||  || align=right data-sort-value="0.77" | 770 m || 
|-id=059 bgcolor=#fefefe
| 556059 ||  || — || January 11, 2010 || Kitt Peak || Spacewatch ||  || align=right data-sort-value="0.64" | 640 m || 
|-id=060 bgcolor=#fefefe
| 556060 ||  || — || March 20, 2010 || Catalina || CSS ||  || align=right data-sort-value="0.70" | 700 m || 
|-id=061 bgcolor=#fefefe
| 556061 ||  || — || October 10, 2004 || Kitt Peak || Spacewatch ||  || align=right data-sort-value="0.59" | 590 m || 
|-id=062 bgcolor=#fefefe
| 556062 ||  || — || January 11, 2010 || Mount Lemmon || Mount Lemmon Survey ||  || align=right data-sort-value="0.62" | 620 m || 
|-id=063 bgcolor=#fefefe
| 556063 ||  || — || September 29, 2008 || Mount Lemmon || Mount Lemmon Survey ||  || align=right data-sort-value="0.79" | 790 m || 
|-id=064 bgcolor=#fefefe
| 556064 ||  || — || April 5, 2014 || Haleakala || Pan-STARRS ||  || align=right data-sort-value="0.81" | 810 m || 
|-id=065 bgcolor=#fefefe
| 556065 ||  || — || April 29, 2003 || Kitt Peak || Spacewatch ||  || align=right data-sort-value="0.83" | 830 m || 
|-id=066 bgcolor=#fefefe
| 556066 ||  || — || April 11, 2003 || Kitt Peak || Spacewatch ||  || align=right data-sort-value="0.76" | 760 m || 
|-id=067 bgcolor=#C2E0FF
| 556067 ||  || — || April 21, 2012 || Haleakala || Pan-STARRS || plutinocritical || align=right | 235 km || 
|-id=068 bgcolor=#C2E0FF
| 556068 ||  || — || July 8, 2013 || Haleakala || Pan-STARRS || plutinocritical || align=right | 425 km || 
|-id=069 bgcolor=#fefefe
| 556069 ||  || — || May 4, 2014 || Haleakala || Pan-STARRS ||  || align=right data-sort-value="0.55" | 550 m || 
|-id=070 bgcolor=#fefefe
| 556070 ||  || — || May 6, 2014 || Haleakala || Pan-STARRS ||  || align=right data-sort-value="0.70" | 700 m || 
|-id=071 bgcolor=#fefefe
| 556071 ||  || — || May 6, 2014 || Haleakala || Pan-STARRS ||  || align=right data-sort-value="0.66" | 660 m || 
|-id=072 bgcolor=#d6d6d6
| 556072 ||  || — || May 7, 2014 || Haleakala || Pan-STARRS ||  || align=right | 2.6 km || 
|-id=073 bgcolor=#d6d6d6
| 556073 ||  || — || May 2, 2014 || Mount Lemmon || Mount Lemmon Survey ||  || align=right | 1.6 km || 
|-id=074 bgcolor=#d6d6d6
| 556074 ||  || — || May 6, 2014 || Haleakala || Pan-STARRS ||  || align=right | 2.3 km || 
|-id=075 bgcolor=#d6d6d6
| 556075 ||  || — || May 4, 2014 || Mount Lemmon || Mount Lemmon Survey ||  || align=right | 2.2 km || 
|-id=076 bgcolor=#fefefe
| 556076 ||  || — || May 4, 2014 || Haleakala || Pan-STARRS ||  || align=right data-sort-value="0.51" | 510 m || 
|-id=077 bgcolor=#E9E9E9
| 556077 ||  || — || May 5, 2014 || Mount Lemmon || Mount Lemmon Survey ||  || align=right | 1.8 km || 
|-id=078 bgcolor=#d6d6d6
| 556078 ||  || — || February 15, 2013 || Haleakala || Pan-STARRS || 3:2 || align=right | 3.7 km || 
|-id=079 bgcolor=#d6d6d6
| 556079 ||  || — || August 23, 2004 || Kitt Peak || Spacewatch ||  || align=right | 3.9 km || 
|-id=080 bgcolor=#fefefe
| 556080 ||  || — || September 26, 2000 || Haleakala || AMOS ||  || align=right data-sort-value="0.91" | 910 m || 
|-id=081 bgcolor=#fefefe
| 556081 ||  || — || September 23, 2008 || Mount Lemmon || Mount Lemmon Survey ||  || align=right data-sort-value="0.76" | 760 m || 
|-id=082 bgcolor=#fefefe
| 556082 ||  || — || November 19, 2008 || Mount Lemmon || Mount Lemmon Survey ||  || align=right data-sort-value="0.83" | 830 m || 
|-id=083 bgcolor=#fefefe
| 556083 ||  || — || September 8, 2011 || Kitt Peak || Spacewatch ||  || align=right data-sort-value="0.60" | 600 m || 
|-id=084 bgcolor=#fefefe
| 556084 ||  || — || September 25, 2008 || Kitt Peak || Spacewatch ||  || align=right data-sort-value="0.76" | 760 m || 
|-id=085 bgcolor=#fefefe
| 556085 ||  || — || September 4, 2011 || Haleakala || Pan-STARRS || V || align=right data-sort-value="0.52" | 520 m || 
|-id=086 bgcolor=#fefefe
| 556086 ||  || — || May 7, 2014 || Haleakala || Pan-STARRS ||  || align=right data-sort-value="0.61" | 610 m || 
|-id=087 bgcolor=#fefefe
| 556087 ||  || — || December 3, 2005 || Mauna Kea || Mauna Kea Obs. ||  || align=right data-sort-value="0.85" | 850 m || 
|-id=088 bgcolor=#fefefe
| 556088 ||  || — || August 11, 2007 || Anderson Mesa || LONEOS ||  || align=right data-sort-value="0.67" | 670 m || 
|-id=089 bgcolor=#fefefe
| 556089 ||  || — || April 5, 2014 || Haleakala || Pan-STARRS ||  || align=right data-sort-value="0.63" | 630 m || 
|-id=090 bgcolor=#fefefe
| 556090 ||  || — || April 22, 2014 || Kitt Peak || Spacewatch ||  || align=right data-sort-value="0.55" | 550 m || 
|-id=091 bgcolor=#fefefe
| 556091 ||  || — || September 23, 2011 || Kitt Peak || Spacewatch ||  || align=right data-sort-value="0.63" | 630 m || 
|-id=092 bgcolor=#fefefe
| 556092 ||  || — || December 25, 2005 || Kitt Peak || Spacewatch ||  || align=right data-sort-value="0.53" | 530 m || 
|-id=093 bgcolor=#fefefe
| 556093 ||  || — || September 23, 2011 || Haleakala || Pan-STARRS || NYS || align=right data-sort-value="0.52" | 520 m || 
|-id=094 bgcolor=#fefefe
| 556094 ||  || — || September 2, 2011 || Haleakala || Pan-STARRS ||  || align=right data-sort-value="0.68" | 680 m || 
|-id=095 bgcolor=#fefefe
| 556095 ||  || — || January 13, 2013 || Mount Lemmon || Mount Lemmon Survey ||  || align=right data-sort-value="0.70" | 700 m || 
|-id=096 bgcolor=#fefefe
| 556096 ||  || — || November 7, 2012 || Haleakala || Pan-STARRS ||  || align=right data-sort-value="0.63" | 630 m || 
|-id=097 bgcolor=#fefefe
| 556097 ||  || — || April 21, 2014 || Kitt Peak || Spacewatch ||  || align=right data-sort-value="0.72" | 720 m || 
|-id=098 bgcolor=#fefefe
| 556098 ||  || — || April 22, 2007 || Mount Lemmon || Mount Lemmon Survey ||  || align=right data-sort-value="0.64" | 640 m || 
|-id=099 bgcolor=#d6d6d6
| 556099 ||  || — || January 17, 2013 || Mount Lemmon || Mount Lemmon Survey || 7:4 || align=right | 3.0 km || 
|-id=100 bgcolor=#fefefe
| 556100 ||  || — || February 28, 2014 || Haleakala || Pan-STARRS ||  || align=right data-sort-value="0.94" | 940 m || 
|}

556101–556200 

|-bgcolor=#fefefe
| 556101 ||  || — || February 20, 2014 || Haleakala || Pan-STARRS ||  || align=right data-sort-value="0.65" | 650 m || 
|-id=102 bgcolor=#fefefe
| 556102 ||  || — || April 21, 2014 || Kitt Peak || Spacewatch ||  || align=right data-sort-value="0.63" | 630 m || 
|-id=103 bgcolor=#fefefe
| 556103 ||  || — || September 23, 2011 || Kitt Peak || Spacewatch ||  || align=right data-sort-value="0.81" | 810 m || 
|-id=104 bgcolor=#fefefe
| 556104 ||  || — || May 9, 2014 || Kitt Peak || Spacewatch || H || align=right data-sort-value="0.45" | 450 m || 
|-id=105 bgcolor=#fefefe
| 556105 ||  || — || April 5, 2014 || Haleakala || Pan-STARRS ||  || align=right data-sort-value="0.59" | 590 m || 
|-id=106 bgcolor=#fefefe
| 556106 ||  || — || April 19, 2007 || Kitt Peak || Spacewatch ||  || align=right data-sort-value="0.51" | 510 m || 
|-id=107 bgcolor=#fefefe
| 556107 ||  || — || February 18, 2010 || Kitt Peak || Spacewatch ||  || align=right data-sort-value="0.76" | 760 m || 
|-id=108 bgcolor=#fefefe
| 556108 ||  || — || September 4, 2011 || Haleakala || Pan-STARRS ||  || align=right data-sort-value="0.55" | 550 m || 
|-id=109 bgcolor=#fefefe
| 556109 ||  || — || May 24, 2014 || Haleakala || Pan-STARRS ||  || align=right data-sort-value="0.81" | 810 m || 
|-id=110 bgcolor=#fefefe
| 556110 ||  || — || March 14, 2010 || Mount Lemmon || Mount Lemmon Survey || NYS || align=right data-sort-value="0.59" | 590 m || 
|-id=111 bgcolor=#fefefe
| 556111 ||  || — || May 18, 2014 || Mount Lemmon || Mount Lemmon Survey ||  || align=right data-sort-value="0.77" | 770 m || 
|-id=112 bgcolor=#fefefe
| 556112 ||  || — || February 16, 2010 || Kitt Peak || Spacewatch ||  || align=right data-sort-value="0.56" | 560 m || 
|-id=113 bgcolor=#fefefe
| 556113 ||  || — || September 23, 2011 || Kitt Peak || Spacewatch ||  || align=right data-sort-value="0.88" | 880 m || 
|-id=114 bgcolor=#fefefe
| 556114 ||  || — || September 2, 2011 || Haleakala || Pan-STARRS ||  || align=right data-sort-value="0.58" | 580 m || 
|-id=115 bgcolor=#fefefe
| 556115 ||  || — || September 2, 2011 || Kitt Peak || Pan-STARRS ||  || align=right data-sort-value="0.60" | 600 m || 
|-id=116 bgcolor=#fefefe
| 556116 ||  || — || September 12, 2007 || Catalina || CSS ||  || align=right data-sort-value="0.83" | 830 m || 
|-id=117 bgcolor=#fefefe
| 556117 ||  || — || September 29, 2011 || Mount Lemmon || Mount Lemmon Survey ||  || align=right data-sort-value="0.52" | 520 m || 
|-id=118 bgcolor=#fefefe
| 556118 ||  || — || November 9, 2008 || Mount Lemmon || Mount Lemmon Survey ||  || align=right data-sort-value="0.67" | 670 m || 
|-id=119 bgcolor=#fefefe
| 556119 ||  || — || May 20, 2014 || Haleakala || Pan-STARRS ||  || align=right data-sort-value="0.62" | 620 m || 
|-id=120 bgcolor=#fefefe
| 556120 ||  || — || October 1, 2008 || Kitt Peak || Spacewatch ||  || align=right data-sort-value="0.65" | 650 m || 
|-id=121 bgcolor=#fefefe
| 556121 ||  || — || November 20, 2003 || Apache Point || SDSS Collaboration ||  || align=right data-sort-value="0.87" | 870 m || 
|-id=122 bgcolor=#d6d6d6
| 556122 ||  || — || May 28, 2014 || Haleakala || Pan-STARRS ||  || align=right | 2.8 km || 
|-id=123 bgcolor=#fefefe
| 556123 ||  || — || July 21, 2007 || Lulin || LUSS ||  || align=right | 1.0 km || 
|-id=124 bgcolor=#fefefe
| 556124 ||  || — || December 30, 2005 || Flagstaff || L. H. Wasserman ||  || align=right data-sort-value="0.70" | 700 m || 
|-id=125 bgcolor=#fefefe
| 556125 ||  || — || November 30, 2008 || Kitt Peak || Spacewatch ||  || align=right | 1.0 km || 
|-id=126 bgcolor=#E9E9E9
| 556126 ||  || — || May 7, 2014 || Haleakala || Pan-STARRS ||  || align=right | 1.1 km || 
|-id=127 bgcolor=#fefefe
| 556127 ||  || — || July 23, 2003 || Palomar || NEAT ||  || align=right | 1.1 km || 
|-id=128 bgcolor=#fefefe
| 556128 ||  || — || March 29, 2014 || Haleakala || Pan-STARRS ||  || align=right data-sort-value="0.64" | 640 m || 
|-id=129 bgcolor=#fefefe
| 556129 ||  || — || July 20, 2003 || Palomar || NEAT || H || align=right data-sort-value="0.86" | 860 m || 
|-id=130 bgcolor=#C2E0FF
| 556130 ||  || — || May 21, 2014 || Haleakala || Pan-STARRS || plutinocritical || align=right | 148 km || 
|-id=131 bgcolor=#fefefe
| 556131 ||  || — || December 29, 2005 || Kitt Peak || Spacewatch ||  || align=right data-sort-value="0.65" | 650 m || 
|-id=132 bgcolor=#fefefe
| 556132 ||  || — || January 14, 2002 || Kitt Peak || Spacewatch ||  || align=right data-sort-value="0.82" | 820 m || 
|-id=133 bgcolor=#fefefe
| 556133 ||  || — || May 20, 2014 || Haleakala || Pan-STARRS ||  || align=right data-sort-value="0.65" | 650 m || 
|-id=134 bgcolor=#fefefe
| 556134 ||  || — || March 15, 2010 || Kitt Peak || Spacewatch ||  || align=right data-sort-value="0.75" | 750 m || 
|-id=135 bgcolor=#fefefe
| 556135 ||  || — || May 28, 2014 || Mount Lemmon || Mount Lemmon Survey ||  || align=right data-sort-value="0.60" | 600 m || 
|-id=136 bgcolor=#E9E9E9
| 556136 ||  || — || May 21, 2014 || Haleakala || Pan-STARRS ||  || align=right | 1.0 km || 
|-id=137 bgcolor=#fefefe
| 556137 ||  || — || May 20, 2014 || Haleakala || Pan-STARRS ||  || align=right data-sort-value="0.68" | 680 m || 
|-id=138 bgcolor=#fefefe
| 556138 ||  || — || May 20, 2014 || Haleakala || Pan-STARRS ||  || align=right data-sort-value="0.57" | 570 m || 
|-id=139 bgcolor=#fefefe
| 556139 ||  || — || March 17, 2009 || Kitt Peak || Spacewatch ||  || align=right data-sort-value="0.49" | 490 m || 
|-id=140 bgcolor=#fefefe
| 556140 ||  || — || May 4, 2014 || Mount Lemmon || Mount Lemmon Survey ||  || align=right data-sort-value="0.87" | 870 m || 
|-id=141 bgcolor=#d6d6d6
| 556141 ||  || — || November 19, 2006 || Kitt Peak || Spacewatch ||  || align=right | 2.0 km || 
|-id=142 bgcolor=#fefefe
| 556142 ||  || — || June 21, 2007 || Kitt Peak || Spacewatch ||  || align=right data-sort-value="0.53" | 530 m || 
|-id=143 bgcolor=#fefefe
| 556143 ||  || — || June 2, 2014 || Mount Lemmon || Mount Lemmon Survey ||  || align=right data-sort-value="0.67" | 670 m || 
|-id=144 bgcolor=#fefefe
| 556144 ||  || — || January 16, 2009 || Kitt Peak || Mount Lemmon Survey ||  || align=right data-sort-value="0.76" | 760 m || 
|-id=145 bgcolor=#fefefe
| 556145 ||  || — || May 10, 2014 || Haleakala || Pan-STARRS ||  || align=right data-sort-value="0.61" | 610 m || 
|-id=146 bgcolor=#fefefe
| 556146 ||  || — || January 2, 2006 || Mount Lemmon || Mount Lemmon Survey ||  || align=right data-sort-value="0.63" | 630 m || 
|-id=147 bgcolor=#fefefe
| 556147 ||  || — || September 26, 2011 || Mount Lemmon || Mount Lemmon Survey ||  || align=right data-sort-value="0.76" | 760 m || 
|-id=148 bgcolor=#fefefe
| 556148 ||  || — || August 24, 2011 || Haleakala || Pan-STARRS ||  || align=right data-sort-value="0.74" | 740 m || 
|-id=149 bgcolor=#E9E9E9
| 556149 ||  || — || July 23, 2001 || Palomar || NEAT || BAR || align=right | 1.2 km || 
|-id=150 bgcolor=#fefefe
| 556150 ||  || — || June 21, 2007 || Mount Lemmon || Mount Lemmon Survey ||  || align=right data-sort-value="0.65" | 650 m || 
|-id=151 bgcolor=#E9E9E9
| 556151 ||  || — || May 25, 2014 || Haleakala || Pan-STARRS ||  || align=right | 1.4 km || 
|-id=152 bgcolor=#fefefe
| 556152 ||  || — || October 22, 2011 || Mount Lemmon || Mount Lemmon Survey || NYS || align=right data-sort-value="0.57" | 570 m || 
|-id=153 bgcolor=#d6d6d6
| 556153 ||  || — || June 3, 2014 || Haleakala || Pan-STARRS ||  || align=right | 2.2 km || 
|-id=154 bgcolor=#fefefe
| 556154 ||  || — || May 28, 2014 || Mount Lemmon || Mount Lemmon Survey ||  || align=right data-sort-value="0.71" | 710 m || 
|-id=155 bgcolor=#fefefe
| 556155 ||  || — || September 20, 2011 || Kitt Peak || Spacewatch ||  || align=right data-sort-value="0.69" | 690 m || 
|-id=156 bgcolor=#E9E9E9
| 556156 ||  || — || June 6, 2014 || Haleakala || Pan-STARRS ||  || align=right data-sort-value="0.96" | 960 m || 
|-id=157 bgcolor=#E9E9E9
| 556157 ||  || — || July 9, 2010 || Siding Spring || SSS ||  || align=right | 1.4 km || 
|-id=158 bgcolor=#fefefe
| 556158 ||  || — || April 10, 2010 || Mount Lemmon || Mount Lemmon Survey ||  || align=right data-sort-value="0.66" | 660 m || 
|-id=159 bgcolor=#fefefe
| 556159 ||  || — || January 5, 2013 || Mount Lemmon || Mount Lemmon Survey || H || align=right data-sort-value="0.67" | 670 m || 
|-id=160 bgcolor=#E9E9E9
| 556160 ||  || — || October 31, 2006 || Kitt Peak || Spacewatch ||  || align=right | 1.4 km || 
|-id=161 bgcolor=#E9E9E9
| 556161 ||  || — || September 9, 2010 || La Sagra || OAM Obs. ||  || align=right data-sort-value="0.93" | 930 m || 
|-id=162 bgcolor=#E9E9E9
| 556162 ||  || — || June 4, 2014 || Haleakala || Pan-STARRS ||  || align=right | 1.8 km || 
|-id=163 bgcolor=#E9E9E9
| 556163 ||  || — || June 2, 2014 || Haleakala || Pan-STARRS ||  || align=right | 1.2 km || 
|-id=164 bgcolor=#fefefe
| 556164 ||  || — || May 6, 2014 || Haleakala || Pan-STARRS ||  || align=right data-sort-value="0.76" | 760 m || 
|-id=165 bgcolor=#FA8072
| 556165 ||  || — || November 4, 2012 || Haleakala || Pan-STARRS || H || align=right data-sort-value="0.55" | 550 m || 
|-id=166 bgcolor=#fefefe
| 556166 ||  || — || May 6, 2014 || Haleakala || Pan-STARRS ||  || align=right data-sort-value="0.70" | 700 m || 
|-id=167 bgcolor=#fefefe
| 556167 ||  || — || July 8, 2002 || Palomar || NEAT ||  || align=right | 1.2 km || 
|-id=168 bgcolor=#fefefe
| 556168 ||  || — || October 28, 2011 || Mount Lemmon || Mount Lemmon Survey ||  || align=right data-sort-value="0.57" | 570 m || 
|-id=169 bgcolor=#E9E9E9
| 556169 ||  || — || April 3, 2005 || Palomar || NEAT ||  || align=right | 1.1 km || 
|-id=170 bgcolor=#FA8072
| 556170 ||  || — || May 7, 2010 || Mount Lemmon || Mount Lemmon Survey ||  || align=right | 1.1 km || 
|-id=171 bgcolor=#fefefe
| 556171 ||  || — || March 25, 2006 || Palomar || NEAT ||  || align=right data-sort-value="0.87" | 870 m || 
|-id=172 bgcolor=#fefefe
| 556172 ||  || — || April 24, 2003 || Kitt Peak || Spacewatch || V || align=right data-sort-value="0.50" | 500 m || 
|-id=173 bgcolor=#fefefe
| 556173 ||  || — || January 23, 2006 || Kitt Peak || Spacewatch ||  || align=right data-sort-value="0.70" | 700 m || 
|-id=174 bgcolor=#fefefe
| 556174 ||  || — || June 3, 2014 || Haleakala || Pan-STARRS ||  || align=right data-sort-value="0.69" | 690 m || 
|-id=175 bgcolor=#fefefe
| 556175 ||  || — || March 13, 2010 || Mount Lemmon || Mount Lemmon Survey ||  || align=right data-sort-value="0.61" | 610 m || 
|-id=176 bgcolor=#fefefe
| 556176 ||  || — || May 8, 2014 || Haleakala || Pan-STARRS ||  || align=right data-sort-value="0.81" | 810 m || 
|-id=177 bgcolor=#fefefe
| 556177 ||  || — || June 18, 2014 || Haleakala || Pan-STARRS ||  || align=right data-sort-value="0.72" | 720 m || 
|-id=178 bgcolor=#E9E9E9
| 556178 ||  || — || July 21, 2002 || Palomar || NEAT ||  || align=right | 1.5 km || 
|-id=179 bgcolor=#fefefe
| 556179 ||  || — || August 15, 2004 || Palomar || NEAT ||  || align=right data-sort-value="0.94" | 940 m || 
|-id=180 bgcolor=#E9E9E9
| 556180 ||  || — || February 16, 2004 || Kitt Peak || Spacewatch || MAR || align=right | 1.3 km || 
|-id=181 bgcolor=#fefefe
| 556181 ||  || — || June 4, 2014 || Haleakala || Pan-STARRS ||  || align=right data-sort-value="0.70" | 700 m || 
|-id=182 bgcolor=#E9E9E9
| 556182 ||  || — || June 2, 2014 || Mount Lemmon || Mount Lemmon Survey ||  || align=right data-sort-value="0.77" | 770 m || 
|-id=183 bgcolor=#fefefe
| 556183 ||  || — || June 1, 2006 || Mount Lemmon || Mount Lemmon Survey ||  || align=right data-sort-value="0.63" | 630 m || 
|-id=184 bgcolor=#fefefe
| 556184 ||  || — || January 17, 2013 || Haleakala || Pan-STARRS ||  || align=right data-sort-value="0.63" | 630 m || 
|-id=185 bgcolor=#fefefe
| 556185 ||  || — || February 3, 2013 || Haleakala || Pan-STARRS ||  || align=right data-sort-value="0.74" | 740 m || 
|-id=186 bgcolor=#fefefe
| 556186 ||  || — || January 22, 2006 || Mount Lemmon || Mount Lemmon Survey ||  || align=right data-sort-value="0.68" | 680 m || 
|-id=187 bgcolor=#E9E9E9
| 556187 ||  || — || June 18, 2014 || Haleakala || Pan-STARRS ||  || align=right | 2.3 km || 
|-id=188 bgcolor=#fefefe
| 556188 ||  || — || September 20, 2003 || Palomar || NEAT ||  || align=right data-sort-value="0.68" | 680 m || 
|-id=189 bgcolor=#E9E9E9
| 556189 ||  || — || October 2, 2006 || Mount Lemmon || Mount Lemmon Survey ||  || align=right data-sort-value="0.80" | 800 m || 
|-id=190 bgcolor=#fefefe
| 556190 ||  || — || October 15, 2007 || Kitt Peak || Spacewatch ||  || align=right data-sort-value="0.69" | 690 m || 
|-id=191 bgcolor=#fefefe
| 556191 ||  || — || April 14, 2010 || Mount Lemmon || Mount Lemmon Survey ||  || align=right data-sort-value="0.82" | 820 m || 
|-id=192 bgcolor=#d6d6d6
| 556192 ||  || — || February 14, 2008 || Catalina || CSS ||  || align=right | 3.4 km || 
|-id=193 bgcolor=#fefefe
| 556193 ||  || — || June 5, 2014 || Haleakala || Pan-STARRS ||  || align=right data-sort-value="0.66" | 660 m || 
|-id=194 bgcolor=#fefefe
| 556194 ||  || — || May 7, 2014 || Haleakala || Pan-STARRS ||  || align=right data-sort-value="0.70" | 700 m || 
|-id=195 bgcolor=#d6d6d6
| 556195 ||  || — || June 29, 2014 || Mount Lemmon || Mount Lemmon Survey ||  || align=right | 2.2 km || 
|-id=196 bgcolor=#fefefe
| 556196 ||  || — || March 26, 2006 || Mount Lemmon || Mount Lemmon Survey ||  || align=right data-sort-value="0.78" | 780 m || 
|-id=197 bgcolor=#E9E9E9
| 556197 ||  || — || November 18, 2011 || Kitt Peak || Spacewatch ||  || align=right | 1.1 km || 
|-id=198 bgcolor=#fefefe
| 556198 ||  || — || June 1, 2014 || Haleakala || Pan-STARRS || H || align=right data-sort-value="0.45" | 450 m || 
|-id=199 bgcolor=#E9E9E9
| 556199 ||  || — || November 28, 2011 || Mount Lemmon || Mount Lemmon Survey ||  || align=right | 1.2 km || 
|-id=200 bgcolor=#fefefe
| 556200 ||  || — || May 23, 2002 || Palomar || NEAT ||  || align=right | 1.1 km || 
|}

556201–556300 

|-bgcolor=#E9E9E9
| 556201 ||  || — || May 30, 2014 || Mount Lemmon || Mount Lemmon Survey ||  || align=right | 1.1 km || 
|-id=202 bgcolor=#fefefe
| 556202 ||  || — || July 8, 2003 || Palomar || NEAT ||  || align=right data-sort-value="0.98" | 980 m || 
|-id=203 bgcolor=#E9E9E9
| 556203 ||  || — || June 27, 2014 || Haleakala || Pan-STARRS ||  || align=right | 1.0 km || 
|-id=204 bgcolor=#E9E9E9
| 556204 ||  || — || November 11, 2006 || Kitt Peak || Spacewatch ||  || align=right | 1.3 km || 
|-id=205 bgcolor=#E9E9E9
| 556205 ||  || — || January 19, 2013 || Mount Lemmon || Mount Lemmon Survey || EUN || align=right | 1.3 km || 
|-id=206 bgcolor=#fefefe
| 556206 ||  || — || December 31, 2012 || Haleakala || Pan-STARRS || H || align=right data-sort-value="0.55" | 550 m || 
|-id=207 bgcolor=#fefefe
| 556207 ||  || — || September 21, 2003 || Kitt Peak || Spacewatch ||  || align=right data-sort-value="0.91" | 910 m || 
|-id=208 bgcolor=#fefefe
| 556208 ||  || — || April 30, 2006 || Kitt Peak || Spacewatch ||  || align=right data-sort-value="0.55" | 550 m || 
|-id=209 bgcolor=#E9E9E9
| 556209 ||  || — || January 13, 2008 || Kitt Peak || Spacewatch ||  || align=right | 1.3 km || 
|-id=210 bgcolor=#E9E9E9
| 556210 ||  || — || September 19, 2001 || Kitt Peak || Spacewatch ||  || align=right | 2.2 km || 
|-id=211 bgcolor=#E9E9E9
| 556211 ||  || — || December 16, 2006 || Mount Lemmon || Mount Lemmon Survey ||  || align=right | 1.5 km || 
|-id=212 bgcolor=#fefefe
| 556212 ||  || — || January 16, 2009 || Mount Lemmon || Mount Lemmon Survey ||  || align=right data-sort-value="0.62" | 620 m || 
|-id=213 bgcolor=#fefefe
| 556213 ||  || — || June 20, 2014 || Haleakala || Pan-STARRS ||  || align=right | 1.0 km || 
|-id=214 bgcolor=#E9E9E9
| 556214 ||  || — || June 24, 2014 || Haleakala || Pan-STARRS ||  || align=right data-sort-value="0.84" | 840 m || 
|-id=215 bgcolor=#fefefe
| 556215 ||  || — || October 20, 2011 || Mount Lemmon || Mount Lemmon Survey ||  || align=right data-sort-value="0.63" | 630 m || 
|-id=216 bgcolor=#E9E9E9
| 556216 ||  || — || December 5, 2007 || Kitt Peak || Spacewatch ||  || align=right data-sort-value="0.88" | 880 m || 
|-id=217 bgcolor=#E9E9E9
| 556217 ||  || — || September 16, 2006 || Catalina || CSS ||  || align=right | 1.5 km || 
|-id=218 bgcolor=#E9E9E9
| 556218 ||  || — || November 15, 2006 || Kitt Peak || Spacewatch ||  || align=right data-sort-value="0.89" | 890 m || 
|-id=219 bgcolor=#fefefe
| 556219 ||  || — || June 21, 2014 || Haleakala || Pan-STARRS ||  || align=right data-sort-value="0.79" | 790 m || 
|-id=220 bgcolor=#E9E9E9
| 556220 ||  || — || June 30, 2014 || Haleakala || Pan-STARRS ||  || align=right data-sort-value="0.77" | 770 m || 
|-id=221 bgcolor=#d6d6d6
| 556221 ||  || — || December 27, 2006 || Mount Lemmon || Mount Lemmon Survey ||  || align=right | 2.9 km || 
|-id=222 bgcolor=#E9E9E9
| 556222 ||  || — || June 29, 2014 || Haleakala || Pan-STARRS ||  || align=right data-sort-value="0.77" | 770 m || 
|-id=223 bgcolor=#d6d6d6
| 556223 ||  || — || June 24, 2014 || Haleakala || Pan-STARRS ||  || align=right | 2.2 km || 
|-id=224 bgcolor=#d6d6d6
| 556224 ||  || — || June 24, 2014 || Haleakala || Pan-STARRS ||  || align=right | 2.3 km || 
|-id=225 bgcolor=#E9E9E9
| 556225 ||  || — || November 26, 2011 || Mount Lemmon || Mount Lemmon Survey ||  || align=right | 1.8 km || 
|-id=226 bgcolor=#E9E9E9
| 556226 ||  || — || December 27, 2011 || Kitt Peak || Spacewatch ||  || align=right | 1.2 km || 
|-id=227 bgcolor=#fefefe
| 556227 ||  || — || May 17, 2010 || Mount Lemmon || Mount Lemmon Survey ||  || align=right data-sort-value="0.68" | 680 m || 
|-id=228 bgcolor=#fefefe
| 556228 ||  || — || September 14, 2007 || Mount Lemmon || Mount Lemmon Survey || MAS || align=right data-sort-value="0.57" | 570 m || 
|-id=229 bgcolor=#E9E9E9
| 556229 ||  || — || July 2, 2014 || Mount Lemmon || Mount Lemmon Survey ||  || align=right data-sort-value="0.82" | 820 m || 
|-id=230 bgcolor=#d6d6d6
| 556230 ||  || — || September 15, 2004 || Mauna Kea || J. Pittichová, J. Bedient ||  || align=right | 3.4 km || 
|-id=231 bgcolor=#E9E9E9
| 556231 ||  || — || July 2, 2014 || Haleakala || Pan-STARRS ||  || align=right data-sort-value="0.85" | 850 m || 
|-id=232 bgcolor=#fefefe
| 556232 ||  || — || June 2, 2014 || Haleakala || Pan-STARRS ||  || align=right data-sort-value="0.55" | 550 m || 
|-id=233 bgcolor=#fefefe
| 556233 ||  || — || June 2, 2014 || Haleakala || Pan-STARRS ||  || align=right data-sort-value="0.72" | 720 m || 
|-id=234 bgcolor=#fefefe
| 556234 ||  || — || January 10, 2013 || Haleakala || Pan-STARRS ||  || align=right data-sort-value="0.61" | 610 m || 
|-id=235 bgcolor=#E9E9E9
| 556235 ||  || — || July 2, 2014 || Haleakala || Pan-STARRS ||  || align=right data-sort-value="0.97" | 970 m || 
|-id=236 bgcolor=#E9E9E9
| 556236 ||  || — || October 11, 2006 || Palomar || NEAT ||  || align=right | 1.5 km || 
|-id=237 bgcolor=#E9E9E9
| 556237 ||  || — || September 17, 2006 || Catalina || CSS ||  || align=right | 1.5 km || 
|-id=238 bgcolor=#E9E9E9
| 556238 ||  || — || July 3, 2014 || Haleakala || Pan-STARRS ||  || align=right | 1.0 km || 
|-id=239 bgcolor=#E9E9E9
| 556239 ||  || — || September 11, 2002 || Palomar || NEAT ||  || align=right data-sort-value="0.87" | 870 m || 
|-id=240 bgcolor=#E9E9E9
| 556240 ||  || — || July 3, 2014 || Haleakala || Pan-STARRS ||  || align=right | 1.3 km || 
|-id=241 bgcolor=#E9E9E9
| 556241 ||  || — || May 7, 2014 || Haleakala || Pan-STARRS ||  || align=right | 1.0 km || 
|-id=242 bgcolor=#fefefe
| 556242 ||  || — || February 3, 2003 || Haleakala || AMOS || H || align=right data-sort-value="0.64" | 640 m || 
|-id=243 bgcolor=#E9E9E9
| 556243 ||  || — || November 15, 2006 || Catalina || CSS ||  || align=right data-sort-value="0.86" | 860 m || 
|-id=244 bgcolor=#E9E9E9
| 556244 ||  || — || September 10, 2010 || Kitt Peak || Spacewatch ||  || align=right | 1.0 km || 
|-id=245 bgcolor=#E9E9E9
| 556245 ||  || — || September 3, 2002 || Palomar || NEAT ||  || align=right | 1.2 km || 
|-id=246 bgcolor=#E9E9E9
| 556246 ||  || — || April 12, 2013 || Haleakala || Pan-STARRS ||  || align=right data-sort-value="0.75" | 750 m || 
|-id=247 bgcolor=#E9E9E9
| 556247 ||  || — || August 28, 2006 || Kitt Peak || Spacewatch ||  || align=right data-sort-value="0.88" | 880 m || 
|-id=248 bgcolor=#fefefe
| 556248 ||  || — || July 24, 2003 || Palomar || NEAT ||  || align=right data-sort-value="0.58" | 580 m || 
|-id=249 bgcolor=#E9E9E9
| 556249 ||  || — || January 4, 2012 || Mount Lemmon || Mount Lemmon Survey ||  || align=right data-sort-value="0.87" | 870 m || 
|-id=250 bgcolor=#E9E9E9
| 556250 ||  || — || September 14, 2002 || Palomar || NEAT ||  || align=right data-sort-value="0.93" | 930 m || 
|-id=251 bgcolor=#fefefe
| 556251 ||  || — || March 16, 2002 || Kitt Peak || Spacewatch ||  || align=right data-sort-value="0.70" | 700 m || 
|-id=252 bgcolor=#fefefe
| 556252 ||  || — || May 4, 2006 || Mount Lemmon || Mount Lemmon Survey ||  || align=right data-sort-value="0.75" | 750 m || 
|-id=253 bgcolor=#E9E9E9
| 556253 ||  || — || September 12, 2002 || Palomar || NEAT ||  || align=right | 1.2 km || 
|-id=254 bgcolor=#E9E9E9
| 556254 ||  || — || June 28, 2014 || Haleakala || Pan-STARRS ||  || align=right | 1.3 km || 
|-id=255 bgcolor=#FA8072
| 556255 ||  || — || October 26, 2012 || Haleakala || Pan-STARRS || H || align=right data-sort-value="0.66" | 660 m || 
|-id=256 bgcolor=#E9E9E9
| 556256 ||  || — || April 1, 2013 || Mount Lemmon || Mount Lemmon Survey ||  || align=right data-sort-value="0.80" | 800 m || 
|-id=257 bgcolor=#E9E9E9
| 556257 ||  || — || December 21, 2003 || Kitt Peak || Spacewatch ||  || align=right data-sort-value="0.98" | 980 m || 
|-id=258 bgcolor=#fefefe
| 556258 ||  || — || July 7, 2014 || Haleakala || Pan-STARRS ||  || align=right data-sort-value="0.53" | 530 m || 
|-id=259 bgcolor=#fefefe
| 556259 ||  || — || July 7, 2014 || Haleakala || Pan-STARRS ||  || align=right data-sort-value="0.64" | 640 m || 
|-id=260 bgcolor=#E9E9E9
| 556260 ||  || — || July 8, 2014 || Haleakala || Pan-STARRS ||  || align=right data-sort-value="0.77" | 770 m || 
|-id=261 bgcolor=#E9E9E9
| 556261 ||  || — || July 5, 2014 || Haleakala || Pan-STARRS ||  || align=right data-sort-value="0.81" | 810 m || 
|-id=262 bgcolor=#fefefe
| 556262 ||  || — || July 5, 2014 || Haleakala || Pan-STARRS ||  || align=right data-sort-value="0.86" | 860 m || 
|-id=263 bgcolor=#fefefe
| 556263 ||  || — || October 28, 2011 || Mount Lemmon || Mount Lemmon Survey ||  || align=right data-sort-value="0.62" | 620 m || 
|-id=264 bgcolor=#E9E9E9
| 556264 ||  || — || December 19, 2007 || Kitt Peak || Spacewatch ||  || align=right data-sort-value="0.89" | 890 m || 
|-id=265 bgcolor=#fefefe
| 556265 ||  || — || July 21, 2014 || Elena Remote || A. Oreshko ||  || align=right data-sort-value="0.85" | 850 m || 
|-id=266 bgcolor=#E9E9E9
| 556266 ||  || — || August 16, 2006 || Palomar || NEAT ||  || align=right data-sort-value="0.98" | 980 m || 
|-id=267 bgcolor=#fefefe
| 556267 ||  || — || July 27, 2014 || Haleakala || Pan-STARRS || H || align=right data-sort-value="0.64" | 640 m || 
|-id=268 bgcolor=#fefefe
| 556268 ||  || — || October 19, 2007 || Catalina || CSS ||  || align=right data-sort-value="0.93" | 930 m || 
|-id=269 bgcolor=#E9E9E9
| 556269 ||  || — || July 25, 2014 || Haleakala || Pan-STARRS ||  || align=right data-sort-value="0.73" | 730 m || 
|-id=270 bgcolor=#fefefe
| 556270 ||  || — || October 21, 2007 || Kitt Peak || Spacewatch ||  || align=right data-sort-value="0.72" | 720 m || 
|-id=271 bgcolor=#E9E9E9
| 556271 ||  || — || September 16, 2010 || Mount Lemmon || Mount Lemmon Survey ||  || align=right | 1.7 km || 
|-id=272 bgcolor=#fefefe
| 556272 ||  || — || October 23, 2003 || Apache Point || SDSS Collaboration ||  || align=right data-sort-value="0.67" | 670 m || 
|-id=273 bgcolor=#fefefe
| 556273 ||  || — || June 25, 2014 || Kitt Peak || Spacewatch ||  || align=right data-sort-value="0.71" | 710 m || 
|-id=274 bgcolor=#E9E9E9
| 556274 ||  || — || June 27, 2014 || Haleakala || Pan-STARRS ||  || align=right data-sort-value="0.98" | 980 m || 
|-id=275 bgcolor=#E9E9E9
| 556275 ||  || — || July 25, 2014 || Haleakala || Pan-STARRS ||  || align=right data-sort-value="0.96" | 960 m || 
|-id=276 bgcolor=#E9E9E9
| 556276 ||  || — || August 18, 2002 || Kitt Peak || NEAT ||  || align=right data-sort-value="0.73" | 730 m || 
|-id=277 bgcolor=#fefefe
| 556277 ||  || — || November 4, 2007 || Mount Lemmon || Mount Lemmon Survey ||  || align=right data-sort-value="0.51" | 510 m || 
|-id=278 bgcolor=#E9E9E9
| 556278 ||  || — || November 18, 2007 || Mount Lemmon || Mount Lemmon Survey ||  || align=right data-sort-value="0.71" | 710 m || 
|-id=279 bgcolor=#E9E9E9
| 556279 ||  || — || June 27, 2014 || Haleakala || Pan-STARRS ||  || align=right data-sort-value="0.75" | 750 m || 
|-id=280 bgcolor=#d6d6d6
| 556280 ||  || — || July 25, 2014 || Haleakala || Pan-STARRS ||  || align=right | 2.1 km || 
|-id=281 bgcolor=#fefefe
| 556281 ||  || — || July 3, 2014 || Haleakala || Pan-STARRS ||  || align=right data-sort-value="0.62" | 620 m || 
|-id=282 bgcolor=#E9E9E9
| 556282 ||  || — || January 26, 2012 || Mount Lemmon || Mount Lemmon Survey ||  || align=right | 1.1 km || 
|-id=283 bgcolor=#fefefe
| 556283 ||  || — || July 3, 2014 || Haleakala || Pan-STARRS ||  || align=right data-sort-value="0.60" | 600 m || 
|-id=284 bgcolor=#E9E9E9
| 556284 ||  || — || August 19, 2010 || Kitt Peak || Spacewatch ||  || align=right | 1.1 km || 
|-id=285 bgcolor=#d6d6d6
| 556285 ||  || — || January 17, 2005 || Kitt Peak || Spacewatch ||  || align=right | 2.7 km || 
|-id=286 bgcolor=#fefefe
| 556286 ||  || — || October 15, 2007 || Mount Lemmon || Mount Lemmon Survey ||  || align=right data-sort-value="0.59" | 590 m || 
|-id=287 bgcolor=#fefefe
| 556287 ||  || — || September 2, 2011 || Haleakala || Pan-STARRS ||  || align=right data-sort-value="0.75" | 750 m || 
|-id=288 bgcolor=#fefefe
| 556288 ||  || — || April 9, 2010 || Mount Lemmon || Mount Lemmon Survey ||  || align=right data-sort-value="0.88" | 880 m || 
|-id=289 bgcolor=#fefefe
| 556289 ||  || — || May 25, 2014 || Haleakala || Pan-STARRS ||  || align=right | 1.1 km || 
|-id=290 bgcolor=#fefefe
| 556290 ||  || — || April 10, 2014 || Haleakala || Pan-STARRS || H || align=right data-sort-value="0.52" | 520 m || 
|-id=291 bgcolor=#d6d6d6
| 556291 ||  || — || May 2, 2008 || Kitt Peak || Spacewatch ||  || align=right | 3.7 km || 
|-id=292 bgcolor=#E9E9E9
| 556292 ||  || — || January 4, 2012 || Kitt Peak || Spacewatch ||  || align=right data-sort-value="0.85" | 850 m || 
|-id=293 bgcolor=#fefefe
| 556293 ||  || — || September 25, 2007 || Kitt Peak || Mount Lemmon Survey ||  || align=right data-sort-value="0.98" | 980 m || 
|-id=294 bgcolor=#E9E9E9
| 556294 ||  || — || June 29, 2014 || Mount Lemmon || Mount Lemmon Survey ||  || align=right data-sort-value="0.92" | 920 m || 
|-id=295 bgcolor=#E9E9E9
| 556295 ||  || — || April 2, 2013 || Mount Lemmon || Mount Lemmon Survey ||  || align=right data-sort-value="0.87" | 870 m || 
|-id=296 bgcolor=#E9E9E9
| 556296 ||  || — || July 26, 2014 || Haleakala || Pan-STARRS ||  || align=right data-sort-value="0.85" | 850 m || 
|-id=297 bgcolor=#fefefe
| 556297 ||  || — || February 16, 2002 || Palomar || NEAT ||  || align=right data-sort-value="0.77" | 770 m || 
|-id=298 bgcolor=#E9E9E9
| 556298 ||  || — || October 26, 2011 || Haleakala || Pan-STARRS ||  || align=right data-sort-value="0.74" | 740 m || 
|-id=299 bgcolor=#fefefe
| 556299 ||  || — || May 6, 2006 || Mount Lemmon || Mount Lemmon Survey ||  || align=right data-sort-value="0.77" | 770 m || 
|-id=300 bgcolor=#E9E9E9
| 556300 ||  || — || February 11, 2008 || Mount Lemmon || Mount Lemmon Survey ||  || align=right | 1.4 km || 
|}

556301–556400 

|-bgcolor=#E9E9E9
| 556301 ||  || — || July 2, 2014 || Haleakala || Pan-STARRS ||  || align=right | 1.3 km || 
|-id=302 bgcolor=#fefefe
| 556302 ||  || — || April 30, 2006 || Kitt Peak || Spacewatch ||  || align=right data-sort-value="0.60" | 600 m || 
|-id=303 bgcolor=#fefefe
| 556303 ||  || — || December 6, 2007 || Mount Lemmon || Mount Lemmon Survey ||  || align=right data-sort-value="0.57" | 570 m || 
|-id=304 bgcolor=#E9E9E9
| 556304 ||  || — || July 26, 2014 || Haleakala || Pan-STARRS ||  || align=right data-sort-value="0.74" | 740 m || 
|-id=305 bgcolor=#fefefe
| 556305 ||  || — || November 20, 2003 || Kitt Peak || Kitt Peak Obs. ||  || align=right data-sort-value="0.83" | 830 m || 
|-id=306 bgcolor=#E9E9E9
| 556306 ||  || — || July 26, 2014 || Haleakala || Pan-STARRS ||  || align=right | 1.6 km || 
|-id=307 bgcolor=#E9E9E9
| 556307 ||  || — || September 4, 2010 || Kitt Peak || Spacewatch ||  || align=right data-sort-value="0.75" | 750 m || 
|-id=308 bgcolor=#E9E9E9
| 556308 ||  || — || November 16, 2010 || Haleakala || PTF ||  || align=right | 1.7 km || 
|-id=309 bgcolor=#E9E9E9
| 556309 ||  || — || September 15, 2010 || Mount Lemmon || Mount Lemmon Survey ||  || align=right data-sort-value="0.73" | 730 m || 
|-id=310 bgcolor=#E9E9E9
| 556310 ||  || — || September 2, 2010 || Kitt Peak || Mount Lemmon Survey ||  || align=right data-sort-value="0.83" | 830 m || 
|-id=311 bgcolor=#E9E9E9
| 556311 ||  || — || February 3, 2012 || Mount Lemmon || Mount Lemmon Survey ||  || align=right | 1.6 km || 
|-id=312 bgcolor=#E9E9E9
| 556312 ||  || — || July 26, 2014 || Haleakala || Pan-STARRS ||  || align=right | 1.5 km || 
|-id=313 bgcolor=#E9E9E9
| 556313 ||  || — || November 24, 2011 || Haleakala || Pan-STARRS ||  || align=right | 1.1 km || 
|-id=314 bgcolor=#E9E9E9
| 556314 ||  || — || January 30, 2003 || Kitt Peak || Spacewatch ||  || align=right | 2.3 km || 
|-id=315 bgcolor=#E9E9E9
| 556315 ||  || — || December 5, 2007 || Kitt Peak || Spacewatch ||  || align=right data-sort-value="0.80" | 800 m || 
|-id=316 bgcolor=#E9E9E9
| 556316 ||  || — || August 28, 2006 || Kitt Peak || Spacewatch ||  || align=right | 1.1 km || 
|-id=317 bgcolor=#E9E9E9
| 556317 ||  || — || November 5, 2007 || Kitt Peak || Spacewatch ||  || align=right data-sort-value="0.80" | 800 m || 
|-id=318 bgcolor=#E9E9E9
| 556318 ||  || — || March 19, 2009 || Kitt Peak || Spacewatch ||  || align=right data-sort-value="0.73" | 730 m || 
|-id=319 bgcolor=#fefefe
| 556319 ||  || — || April 22, 2007 || Mount Lemmon || Mount Lemmon Survey ||  || align=right data-sort-value="0.91" | 910 m || 
|-id=320 bgcolor=#fefefe
| 556320 ||  || — || April 4, 2002 || Palomar || NEAT || NYS || align=right data-sort-value="0.70" | 700 m || 
|-id=321 bgcolor=#fefefe
| 556321 ||  || — || March 20, 1998 || Kitt Peak || Spacewatch || MAS || align=right data-sort-value="0.68" | 680 m || 
|-id=322 bgcolor=#fefefe
| 556322 ||  || — || October 12, 2007 || Kitt Peak || Spacewatch ||  || align=right data-sort-value="0.60" | 600 m || 
|-id=323 bgcolor=#fefefe
| 556323 ||  || — || May 2, 2006 || Mount Lemmon || Mount Lemmon Survey || MAS || align=right data-sort-value="0.56" | 560 m || 
|-id=324 bgcolor=#E9E9E9
| 556324 ||  || — || January 11, 2008 || Kitt Peak || Spacewatch ||  || align=right data-sort-value="0.75" | 750 m || 
|-id=325 bgcolor=#fefefe
| 556325 ||  || — || July 27, 2014 || Haleakala || Pan-STARRS ||  || align=right data-sort-value="0.71" | 710 m || 
|-id=326 bgcolor=#fefefe
| 556326 ||  || — || October 30, 2007 || Mount Lemmon || Mount Lemmon Survey ||  || align=right data-sort-value="0.53" | 530 m || 
|-id=327 bgcolor=#fefefe
| 556327 ||  || — || July 27, 2014 || Haleakala || Pan-STARRS ||  || align=right data-sort-value="0.65" | 650 m || 
|-id=328 bgcolor=#E9E9E9
| 556328 ||  || — || November 12, 2007 || Mount Lemmon || Mount Lemmon Survey ||  || align=right data-sort-value="0.74" | 740 m || 
|-id=329 bgcolor=#fefefe
| 556329 ||  || — || May 25, 2014 || Haleakala || Pan-STARRS ||  || align=right data-sort-value="0.63" | 630 m || 
|-id=330 bgcolor=#E9E9E9
| 556330 ||  || — || June 20, 2002 || Palomar || NEAT ||  || align=right | 1.1 km || 
|-id=331 bgcolor=#fefefe
| 556331 ||  || — || October 11, 2007 || Mount Lemmon || Mount Lemmon Survey ||  || align=right data-sort-value="0.60" | 600 m || 
|-id=332 bgcolor=#d6d6d6
| 556332 ||  || — || April 18, 2013 || Mount Lemmon || Mount Lemmon Survey ||  || align=right | 2.7 km || 
|-id=333 bgcolor=#fefefe
| 556333 ||  || — || December 30, 2008 || Mount Lemmon || Mount Lemmon Survey ||  || align=right data-sort-value="0.81" | 810 m || 
|-id=334 bgcolor=#fefefe
| 556334 ||  || — || May 9, 2014 || Haleakala || Pan-STARRS ||  || align=right data-sort-value="0.77" | 770 m || 
|-id=335 bgcolor=#E9E9E9
| 556335 ||  || — || February 8, 2008 || Mount Lemmon || Mount Lemmon Survey ||  || align=right | 1.5 km || 
|-id=336 bgcolor=#E9E9E9
| 556336 ||  || — || December 30, 2011 || Kitt Peak || Spacewatch ||  || align=right | 1.2 km || 
|-id=337 bgcolor=#fefefe
| 556337 ||  || — || June 20, 2014 || Haleakala || Pan-STARRS || V || align=right data-sort-value="0.60" | 600 m || 
|-id=338 bgcolor=#fefefe
| 556338 ||  || — || June 29, 2014 || Haleakala || Pan-STARRS ||  || align=right data-sort-value="0.71" | 710 m || 
|-id=339 bgcolor=#E9E9E9
| 556339 ||  || — || January 21, 2012 || Catalina || CSS ||  || align=right | 1.4 km || 
|-id=340 bgcolor=#fefefe
| 556340 ||  || — || September 26, 2003 || Apache Point || SDSS Collaboration ||  || align=right data-sort-value="0.73" | 730 m || 
|-id=341 bgcolor=#fefefe
| 556341 ||  || — || June 26, 2014 || Haleakala || Pan-STARRS ||  || align=right data-sort-value="0.72" | 720 m || 
|-id=342 bgcolor=#E9E9E9
| 556342 ||  || — || August 30, 2005 || Palomar || NEAT ||  || align=right | 2.8 km || 
|-id=343 bgcolor=#E9E9E9
| 556343 ||  || — || June 11, 2005 || Catalina || CSS ||  || align=right | 1.4 km || 
|-id=344 bgcolor=#E9E9E9
| 556344 ||  || — || November 16, 2006 || Kitt Peak || Spacewatch ||  || align=right | 1.1 km || 
|-id=345 bgcolor=#E9E9E9
| 556345 ||  || — || September 15, 2006 || Kitt Peak || Spacewatch ||  || align=right data-sort-value="0.64" | 640 m || 
|-id=346 bgcolor=#E9E9E9
| 556346 ||  || — || March 13, 2012 || Mount Lemmon || Mount Lemmon Survey ||  || align=right | 1.6 km || 
|-id=347 bgcolor=#fefefe
| 556347 ||  || — || April 13, 2002 || Kitt Peak || Spacewatch || NYS || align=right data-sort-value="0.85" | 850 m || 
|-id=348 bgcolor=#fefefe
| 556348 ||  || — || March 26, 2009 || Catalina || Mount Lemmon Survey ||  || align=right | 1.2 km || 
|-id=349 bgcolor=#E9E9E9
| 556349 ||  || — || August 31, 2005 || Palomar || NEAT ||  || align=right | 2.1 km || 
|-id=350 bgcolor=#E9E9E9
| 556350 ||  || — || September 16, 2010 || Kitt Peak || Spacewatch ||  || align=right data-sort-value="0.73" | 730 m || 
|-id=351 bgcolor=#fefefe
| 556351 ||  || — || March 10, 2008 || Mount Lemmon || Mount Lemmon Survey || H || align=right data-sort-value="0.72" | 720 m || 
|-id=352 bgcolor=#fefefe
| 556352 ||  || — || September 27, 2003 || Kitt Peak || Spacewatch ||  || align=right data-sort-value="0.50" | 500 m || 
|-id=353 bgcolor=#d6d6d6
| 556353 ||  || — || April 13, 2013 || Kitt Peak || Spacewatch ||  || align=right | 2.5 km || 
|-id=354 bgcolor=#E9E9E9
| 556354 ||  || — || March 1, 2009 || Kitt Peak || Spacewatch ||  || align=right data-sort-value="0.89" | 890 m || 
|-id=355 bgcolor=#E9E9E9
| 556355 ||  || — || January 22, 2004 || Socorro || LINEAR ||  || align=right | 1.0 km || 
|-id=356 bgcolor=#E9E9E9
| 556356 ||  || — || May 7, 2014 || Haleakala || Pan-STARRS || GEF || align=right | 1.00 km || 
|-id=357 bgcolor=#E9E9E9
| 556357 ||  || — || July 25, 2014 || Haleakala || Pan-STARRS ||  || align=right data-sort-value="0.82" | 820 m || 
|-id=358 bgcolor=#fefefe
| 556358 ||  || — || June 30, 2014 || Haleakala || Pan-STARRS ||  || align=right data-sort-value="0.97" | 970 m || 
|-id=359 bgcolor=#E9E9E9
| 556359 ||  || — || October 4, 2002 || Socorro || LINEAR ||  || align=right data-sort-value="0.89" | 890 m || 
|-id=360 bgcolor=#E9E9E9
| 556360 ||  || — || July 27, 2014 || Haleakala || Pan-STARRS ||  || align=right data-sort-value="0.71" | 710 m || 
|-id=361 bgcolor=#E9E9E9
| 556361 ||  || — || March 17, 2009 || Catalina || CSS ||  || align=right | 1.1 km || 
|-id=362 bgcolor=#E9E9E9
| 556362 ||  || — || February 7, 2008 || Altschwendt || W. Ries ||  || align=right | 2.8 km || 
|-id=363 bgcolor=#E9E9E9
| 556363 ||  || — || January 30, 2012 || Mount Lemmon || Mount Lemmon Survey ||  || align=right | 1.8 km || 
|-id=364 bgcolor=#E9E9E9
| 556364 ||  || — || August 21, 2001 || Kitt Peak || Spacewatch ||  || align=right | 1.5 km || 
|-id=365 bgcolor=#d6d6d6
| 556365 ||  || — || August 23, 2003 || Palomar || NEAT ||  || align=right | 2.9 km || 
|-id=366 bgcolor=#fefefe
| 556366 ||  || — || September 24, 2008 || Mount Lemmon || Mount Lemmon Survey ||  || align=right data-sort-value="0.62" | 620 m || 
|-id=367 bgcolor=#fefefe
| 556367 ||  || — || January 16, 2013 || Haleakala || Pan-STARRS ||  || align=right data-sort-value="0.93" | 930 m || 
|-id=368 bgcolor=#fefefe
| 556368 ||  || — || June 4, 2014 || Haleakala || Pan-STARRS || MAS || align=right data-sort-value="0.57" | 570 m || 
|-id=369 bgcolor=#E9E9E9
| 556369 ||  || — || July 29, 2014 || Haleakala || Pan-STARRS ||  || align=right data-sort-value="0.76" | 760 m || 
|-id=370 bgcolor=#E9E9E9
| 556370 ||  || — || November 9, 2007 || Kitt Peak || Spacewatch ||  || align=right data-sort-value="0.76" | 760 m || 
|-id=371 bgcolor=#fefefe
| 556371 ||  || — || March 11, 2013 || Mount Lemmon || Mount Lemmon Survey ||  || align=right data-sort-value="0.79" | 790 m || 
|-id=372 bgcolor=#d6d6d6
| 556372 ||  || — || November 13, 2010 || Mount Lemmon || Mount Lemmon Survey ||  || align=right | 2.5 km || 
|-id=373 bgcolor=#fefefe
| 556373 ||  || — || April 20, 2006 || Kitt Peak || Spacewatch ||  || align=right data-sort-value="0.72" | 720 m || 
|-id=374 bgcolor=#FA8072
| 556374 ||  || — || March 21, 2010 || Kitt Peak || Spacewatch ||  || align=right data-sort-value="0.63" | 630 m || 
|-id=375 bgcolor=#E9E9E9
| 556375 ||  || — || February 10, 2008 || Kitt Peak || Spacewatch ||  || align=right | 1.5 km || 
|-id=376 bgcolor=#E9E9E9
| 556376 ||  || — || December 20, 2011 || ESA OGS || ESA OGS ||  || align=right | 1.5 km || 
|-id=377 bgcolor=#E9E9E9
| 556377 ||  || — || October 3, 2006 || Mount Lemmon || Mount Lemmon Survey ||  || align=right | 1.2 km || 
|-id=378 bgcolor=#E9E9E9
| 556378 ||  || — || December 18, 2007 || Kitt Peak || Spacewatch ||  || align=right data-sort-value="0.85" | 850 m || 
|-id=379 bgcolor=#E9E9E9
| 556379 ||  || — || July 29, 2014 || Haleakala || Pan-STARRS ||  || align=right data-sort-value="0.89" | 890 m || 
|-id=380 bgcolor=#E9E9E9
| 556380 ||  || — || December 29, 2011 || Mount Lemmon || Mount Lemmon Survey ||  || align=right data-sort-value="0.97" | 970 m || 
|-id=381 bgcolor=#E9E9E9
| 556381 ||  || — || July 29, 2014 || Haleakala || Pan-STARRS ||  || align=right | 1.2 km || 
|-id=382 bgcolor=#E9E9E9
| 556382 ||  || — || March 25, 2003 || Palomar || NEAT ||  || align=right | 2.4 km || 
|-id=383 bgcolor=#E9E9E9
| 556383 ||  || — || October 31, 2006 || Mount Lemmon || Mount Lemmon Survey ||  || align=right | 1.2 km || 
|-id=384 bgcolor=#fefefe
| 556384 ||  || — || April 16, 2013 || Cerro Tololo-DECam || CTIO-DECam ||  || align=right data-sort-value="0.62" | 620 m || 
|-id=385 bgcolor=#E9E9E9
| 556385 ||  || — || March 14, 2012 || Mount Lemmon || Mount Lemmon Survey ||  || align=right | 1.5 km || 
|-id=386 bgcolor=#fefefe
| 556386 ||  || — || September 18, 2003 || Palomar || NEAT ||  || align=right data-sort-value="0.62" | 620 m || 
|-id=387 bgcolor=#E9E9E9
| 556387 ||  || — || April 10, 2013 || Haleakala || Pan-STARRS ||  || align=right data-sort-value="0.73" | 730 m || 
|-id=388 bgcolor=#fefefe
| 556388 ||  || — || October 8, 2007 || Mount Lemmon || Mount Lemmon Survey ||  || align=right data-sort-value="0.70" | 700 m || 
|-id=389 bgcolor=#E9E9E9
| 556389 ||  || — || July 27, 2014 || Haleakala || Pan-STARRS ||  || align=right data-sort-value="0.66" | 660 m || 
|-id=390 bgcolor=#fefefe
| 556390 ||  || — || February 12, 2008 || Kitt Peak || Spacewatch || H || align=right data-sort-value="0.55" | 550 m || 
|-id=391 bgcolor=#E9E9E9
| 556391 ||  || — || August 28, 2006 || Pises || Pises Obs. ||  || align=right data-sort-value="0.65" | 650 m || 
|-id=392 bgcolor=#fefefe
| 556392 ||  || — || May 7, 2010 || Mount Lemmon || Mount Lemmon Survey ||  || align=right data-sort-value="0.67" | 670 m || 
|-id=393 bgcolor=#E9E9E9
| 556393 ||  || — || July 29, 2014 || Haleakala || Pan-STARRS ||  || align=right data-sort-value="0.91" | 910 m || 
|-id=394 bgcolor=#fefefe
| 556394 ||  || — || May 9, 2006 || Mount Lemmon || Mount Lemmon Survey ||  || align=right data-sort-value="0.77" | 770 m || 
|-id=395 bgcolor=#E9E9E9
| 556395 ||  || — || June 28, 2014 || Kitt Peak || Spacewatch ||  || align=right data-sort-value="0.79" | 790 m || 
|-id=396 bgcolor=#E9E9E9
| 556396 ||  || — || July 26, 2005 || Palomar || NEAT ||  || align=right | 2.3 km || 
|-id=397 bgcolor=#E9E9E9
| 556397 ||  || — || October 3, 2006 || Mount Lemmon || Mount Lemmon Survey ||  || align=right | 1.2 km || 
|-id=398 bgcolor=#fefefe
| 556398 ||  || — || June 2, 2014 || Haleakala || Pan-STARRS ||  || align=right data-sort-value="0.65" | 650 m || 
|-id=399 bgcolor=#d6d6d6
| 556399 ||  || — || July 28, 2014 || Haleakala || Pan-STARRS ||  || align=right | 2.0 km || 
|-id=400 bgcolor=#E9E9E9
| 556400 ||  || — || January 30, 2012 || Kitt Peak || Spacewatch ||  || align=right | 1.2 km || 
|}

556401–556500 

|-bgcolor=#E9E9E9
| 556401 ||  || — || July 28, 2014 || Haleakala || Pan-STARRS ||  || align=right data-sort-value="0.87" | 870 m || 
|-id=402 bgcolor=#E9E9E9
| 556402 ||  || — || July 5, 2005 || Mount Lemmon || Mount Lemmon Survey ||  || align=right | 1.3 km || 
|-id=403 bgcolor=#E9E9E9
| 556403 ||  || — || July 28, 2014 || Haleakala || Pan-STARRS ||  || align=right data-sort-value="0.73" | 730 m || 
|-id=404 bgcolor=#fefefe
| 556404 ||  || — || January 30, 2009 || Mount Lemmon || Mount Lemmon Survey ||  || align=right data-sort-value="0.76" | 760 m || 
|-id=405 bgcolor=#E9E9E9
| 556405 ||  || — || November 13, 2006 || Mount Lemmon || Mount Lemmon Survey ||  || align=right data-sort-value="0.76" | 760 m || 
|-id=406 bgcolor=#fefefe
| 556406 ||  || — || February 5, 2013 || Kitt Peak || Spacewatch ||  || align=right data-sort-value="0.58" | 580 m || 
|-id=407 bgcolor=#fefefe
| 556407 ||  || — || April 2, 2006 || Kitt Peak || Spacewatch ||  || align=right data-sort-value="0.54" | 540 m || 
|-id=408 bgcolor=#fefefe
| 556408 ||  || — || June 27, 2014 || Haleakala || Pan-STARRS ||  || align=right data-sort-value="0.66" | 660 m || 
|-id=409 bgcolor=#E9E9E9
| 556409 ||  || — || September 2, 2010 || Mount Lemmon || Mount Lemmon Survey ||  || align=right data-sort-value="0.89" | 890 m || 
|-id=410 bgcolor=#fefefe
| 556410 ||  || — || June 4, 2014 || Haleakala || Pan-STARRS ||  || align=right data-sort-value="0.59" | 590 m || 
|-id=411 bgcolor=#E9E9E9
| 556411 ||  || — || January 18, 2008 || Mount Lemmon || Mount Lemmon Survey ||  || align=right data-sort-value="0.90" | 900 m || 
|-id=412 bgcolor=#E9E9E9
| 556412 ||  || — || July 28, 2014 || Haleakala || Pan-STARRS ||  || align=right data-sort-value="0.69" | 690 m || 
|-id=413 bgcolor=#fefefe
| 556413 ||  || — || October 21, 2007 || Mount Lemmon || Mount Lemmon Survey ||  || align=right data-sort-value="0.83" | 830 m || 
|-id=414 bgcolor=#fefefe
| 556414 ||  || — || January 16, 2005 || Mauna Kea || Mauna Kea Obs. ||  || align=right data-sort-value="0.78" | 780 m || 
|-id=415 bgcolor=#E9E9E9
| 556415 ||  || — || August 12, 2010 || Kitt Peak || Spacewatch ||  || align=right data-sort-value="0.92" | 920 m || 
|-id=416 bgcolor=#C2E0FF
| 556416 ||  || — || July 28, 2014 || Haleakala || Pan-STARRS || cubewano (cold) || align=right | 486 km || 
|-id=417 bgcolor=#E9E9E9
| 556417 ||  || — || November 20, 2001 || Socorro || LINEAR ||  || align=right | 1.1 km || 
|-id=418 bgcolor=#fefefe
| 556418 ||  || — || October 19, 2003 || Apache Point || SDSS Collaboration ||  || align=right data-sort-value="0.68" | 680 m || 
|-id=419 bgcolor=#d6d6d6
| 556419 ||  || — || February 23, 2012 || Mount Lemmon || Mount Lemmon Survey ||  || align=right | 2.2 km || 
|-id=420 bgcolor=#E9E9E9
| 556420 ||  || — || July 25, 2014 || Haleakala || Pan-STARRS ||  || align=right | 1.5 km || 
|-id=421 bgcolor=#E9E9E9
| 556421 ||  || — || November 19, 2006 || Catalina || CSS ||  || align=right | 1.1 km || 
|-id=422 bgcolor=#E9E9E9
| 556422 ||  || — || April 17, 2013 || Haleakala || Pan-STARRS ||  || align=right | 1.4 km || 
|-id=423 bgcolor=#fefefe
| 556423 ||  || — || May 7, 2014 || Haleakala || Pan-STARRS ||  || align=right data-sort-value="0.74" | 740 m || 
|-id=424 bgcolor=#d6d6d6
| 556424 ||  || — || March 14, 2007 || Kitt Peak || Spacewatch ||  || align=right | 2.9 km || 
|-id=425 bgcolor=#E9E9E9
| 556425 ||  || — || June 26, 2014 || Kitt Peak || Spacewatch ||  || align=right | 1.9 km || 
|-id=426 bgcolor=#E9E9E9
| 556426 ||  || — || September 12, 2002 || Palomar || NEAT ||  || align=right data-sort-value="0.87" | 870 m || 
|-id=427 bgcolor=#E9E9E9
| 556427 ||  || — || July 28, 2014 || Haleakala || Pan-STARRS ||  || align=right data-sort-value="0.83" | 830 m || 
|-id=428 bgcolor=#E9E9E9
| 556428 ||  || — || July 25, 2014 || Haleakala || Pan-STARRS ||  || align=right data-sort-value="0.67" | 670 m || 
|-id=429 bgcolor=#E9E9E9
| 556429 ||  || — || February 8, 1999 || Mauna Kea || C. Veillet, J. Anderson ||  || align=right | 1.0 km || 
|-id=430 bgcolor=#fefefe
| 556430 ||  || — || July 25, 2014 || Haleakala || Pan-STARRS ||  || align=right data-sort-value="0.74" | 740 m || 
|-id=431 bgcolor=#fefefe
| 556431 ||  || — || January 3, 2012 || Mount Lemmon || Mount Lemmon Survey ||  || align=right data-sort-value="0.96" | 960 m || 
|-id=432 bgcolor=#E9E9E9
| 556432 ||  || — || July 25, 2014 || Haleakala || Pan-STARRS ||  || align=right data-sort-value="0.62" | 620 m || 
|-id=433 bgcolor=#fefefe
| 556433 ||  || — || December 16, 2007 || Kitt Peak || Spacewatch ||  || align=right data-sort-value="0.74" | 740 m || 
|-id=434 bgcolor=#fefefe
| 556434 ||  || — || February 5, 2009 || Kitt Peak || Spacewatch ||  || align=right data-sort-value="0.61" | 610 m || 
|-id=435 bgcolor=#E9E9E9
| 556435 ||  || — || July 26, 2014 || Haleakala || Pan-STARRS ||  || align=right data-sort-value="0.79" | 790 m || 
|-id=436 bgcolor=#E9E9E9
| 556436 ||  || — || April 2, 2009 || Kitt Peak || Spacewatch ||  || align=right data-sort-value="0.79" | 790 m || 
|-id=437 bgcolor=#E9E9E9
| 556437 ||  || — || July 30, 2014 || Haleakala || Pan-STARRS ||  || align=right data-sort-value="0.68" | 680 m || 
|-id=438 bgcolor=#E9E9E9
| 556438 ||  || — || July 31, 2014 || Haleakala || Pan-STARRS ||  || align=right | 1.1 km || 
|-id=439 bgcolor=#fefefe
| 556439 ||  || — || October 1, 2003 || Anderson Mesa || LONEOS ||  || align=right | 1.0 km || 
|-id=440 bgcolor=#E9E9E9
| 556440 ||  || — || August 19, 2001 || Cerro Tololo || Cerro Tololo Obs. ||  || align=right | 1.3 km || 
|-id=441 bgcolor=#E9E9E9
| 556441 ||  || — || July 31, 2014 || Haleakala || Pan-STARRS ||  || align=right data-sort-value="0.79" | 790 m || 
|-id=442 bgcolor=#E9E9E9
| 556442 ||  || — || July 29, 2014 || Haleakala || Pan-STARRS ||  || align=right data-sort-value="0.74" | 740 m || 
|-id=443 bgcolor=#d6d6d6
| 556443 ||  || — || July 30, 2014 || Haleakala || Pan-STARRS ||  || align=right | 2.1 km || 
|-id=444 bgcolor=#d6d6d6
| 556444 ||  || — || July 28, 2014 || Haleakala || Pan-STARRS ||  || align=right | 1.9 km || 
|-id=445 bgcolor=#fefefe
| 556445 ||  || — || July 25, 2014 || Haleakala || Pan-STARRS ||  || align=right data-sort-value="0.67" | 670 m || 
|-id=446 bgcolor=#fefefe
| 556446 ||  || — || April 2, 2006 || Kitt Peak || Spacewatch || NYS || align=right data-sort-value="0.52" | 520 m || 
|-id=447 bgcolor=#E9E9E9
| 556447 ||  || — || January 1, 2012 || Mount Lemmon || Mount Lemmon Survey ||  || align=right data-sort-value="0.76" | 760 m || 
|-id=448 bgcolor=#E9E9E9
| 556448 ||  || — || June 30, 2014 || Haleakala || Pan-STARRS ||  || align=right | 1.1 km || 
|-id=449 bgcolor=#fefefe
| 556449 ||  || — || November 7, 2007 || Mount Lemmon || Mount Lemmon Survey ||  || align=right data-sort-value="0.61" | 610 m || 
|-id=450 bgcolor=#fefefe
| 556450 ||  || — || August 22, 2003 || Palomar || NEAT ||  || align=right data-sort-value="0.97" | 970 m || 
|-id=451 bgcolor=#fefefe
| 556451 ||  || — || October 5, 2003 || Kitt Peak || Spacewatch ||  || align=right data-sort-value="0.61" | 610 m || 
|-id=452 bgcolor=#fefefe
| 556452 ||  || — || May 26, 2006 || Mount Lemmon || Mount Lemmon Survey ||  || align=right data-sort-value="0.51" | 510 m || 
|-id=453 bgcolor=#fefefe
| 556453 ||  || — || December 22, 2008 || Kitt Peak || Spacewatch ||  || align=right data-sort-value="0.62" | 620 m || 
|-id=454 bgcolor=#E9E9E9
| 556454 ||  || — || July 25, 2014 || Haleakala || Pan-STARRS ||  || align=right data-sort-value="0.79" | 790 m || 
|-id=455 bgcolor=#E9E9E9
| 556455 ||  || — || January 30, 2012 || Kitt Peak || Spacewatch ||  || align=right data-sort-value="0.80" | 800 m || 
|-id=456 bgcolor=#E9E9E9
| 556456 ||  || — || August 18, 2006 || Kitt Peak || Spacewatch ||  || align=right data-sort-value="0.69" | 690 m || 
|-id=457 bgcolor=#fefefe
| 556457 ||  || — || June 24, 2014 || Haleakala || Pan-STARRS ||  || align=right data-sort-value="0.70" | 700 m || 
|-id=458 bgcolor=#E9E9E9
| 556458 ||  || — || July 25, 2014 || Haleakala || Pan-STARRS ||  || align=right data-sort-value="0.73" | 730 m || 
|-id=459 bgcolor=#E9E9E9
| 556459 ||  || — || October 16, 2006 || Catalina || CSS ||  || align=right | 1.8 km || 
|-id=460 bgcolor=#E9E9E9
| 556460 ||  || — || October 17, 2006 || Catalina || CSS ||  || align=right | 1.0 km || 
|-id=461 bgcolor=#E9E9E9
| 556461 ||  || — || July 25, 2014 || Haleakala || Pan-STARRS ||  || align=right data-sort-value="0.97" | 970 m || 
|-id=462 bgcolor=#E9E9E9
| 556462 ||  || — || April 10, 2013 || Mount Lemmon || Mount Lemmon Survey ||  || align=right data-sort-value="0.83" | 830 m || 
|-id=463 bgcolor=#fefefe
| 556463 ||  || — || March 3, 2009 || Mount Lemmon || Mount Lemmon Survey ||  || align=right data-sort-value="0.91" | 910 m || 
|-id=464 bgcolor=#E9E9E9
| 556464 ||  || — || July 26, 2014 || Haleakala || Pan-STARRS ||  || align=right data-sort-value="0.80" | 800 m || 
|-id=465 bgcolor=#fefefe
| 556465 ||  || — || August 3, 2014 || Haleakala || Pan-STARRS || H || align=right data-sort-value="0.56" | 560 m || 
|-id=466 bgcolor=#E9E9E9
| 556466 ||  || — || July 28, 2014 || Haleakala || Pan-STARRS ||  || align=right data-sort-value="0.94" | 940 m || 
|-id=467 bgcolor=#E9E9E9
| 556467 ||  || — || September 19, 2001 || Apache Point || SDSS Collaboration ||  || align=right | 1.9 km || 
|-id=468 bgcolor=#E9E9E9
| 556468 ||  || — || August 4, 2014 || Haleakala || Pan-STARRS ||  || align=right | 1.4 km || 
|-id=469 bgcolor=#E9E9E9
| 556469 ||  || — || August 4, 2014 || Haleakala || Pan-STARRS ||  || align=right | 1.5 km || 
|-id=470 bgcolor=#fefefe
| 556470 ||  || — || June 21, 2010 || Mount Lemmon || Mount Lemmon Survey ||  || align=right data-sort-value="0.59" | 590 m || 
|-id=471 bgcolor=#E9E9E9
| 556471 ||  || — || April 10, 2013 || Mount Lemmon || Mount Lemmon Survey ||  || align=right | 1.1 km || 
|-id=472 bgcolor=#E9E9E9
| 556472 ||  || — || October 17, 2010 || Mount Lemmon || Mount Lemmon Survey ||  || align=right | 1.4 km || 
|-id=473 bgcolor=#fefefe
| 556473 ||  || — || September 30, 2007 || Kitt Peak || Spacewatch ||  || align=right data-sort-value="0.98" | 980 m || 
|-id=474 bgcolor=#E9E9E9
| 556474 ||  || — || June 24, 2014 || Mount Lemmon || Mount Lemmon Survey ||  || align=right | 1.6 km || 
|-id=475 bgcolor=#fefefe
| 556475 ||  || — || June 20, 2014 || Haleakala || Pan-STARRS ||  || align=right data-sort-value="0.81" | 810 m || 
|-id=476 bgcolor=#fefefe
| 556476 ||  || — || July 8, 2003 || Palomar || NEAT ||  || align=right data-sort-value="0.81" | 810 m || 
|-id=477 bgcolor=#E9E9E9
| 556477 ||  || — || July 27, 2014 || ESA OGS || ESA OGS ||  || align=right data-sort-value="0.81" | 810 m || 
|-id=478 bgcolor=#fefefe
| 556478 ||  || — || June 2, 2014 || Mount Lemmon || Mount Lemmon Survey ||  || align=right data-sort-value="0.67" | 670 m || 
|-id=479 bgcolor=#E9E9E9
| 556479 ||  || — || July 25, 2014 || Haleakala || Pan-STARRS ||  || align=right data-sort-value="0.98" | 980 m || 
|-id=480 bgcolor=#E9E9E9
| 556480 ||  || — || March 15, 2008 || Mount Lemmon || Mount Lemmon Survey ||  || align=right | 2.1 km || 
|-id=481 bgcolor=#E9E9E9
| 556481 ||  || — || August 3, 2014 || Haleakala || Pan-STARRS ||  || align=right | 1.5 km || 
|-id=482 bgcolor=#d6d6d6
| 556482 ||  || — || August 3, 2014 || Kitt Peak || Pan-STARRS ||  || align=right | 1.9 km || 
|-id=483 bgcolor=#E9E9E9
| 556483 ||  || — || October 6, 2002 || Palomar || NEAT ||  || align=right | 1.1 km || 
|-id=484 bgcolor=#E9E9E9
| 556484 ||  || — || August 6, 2014 || Haleakala || Pan-STARRS ||  || align=right | 1.3 km || 
|-id=485 bgcolor=#fefefe
| 556485 ||  || — || July 25, 2014 || Haleakala || Pan-STARRS ||  || align=right data-sort-value="0.61" | 610 m || 
|-id=486 bgcolor=#E9E9E9
| 556486 ||  || — || September 15, 2006 || Kitt Peak || Spacewatch ||  || align=right | 1.2 km || 
|-id=487 bgcolor=#E9E9E9
| 556487 ||  || — || September 14, 2006 || Kitt Peak || Spacewatch ||  || align=right data-sort-value="0.91" | 910 m || 
|-id=488 bgcolor=#E9E9E9
| 556488 ||  || — || February 7, 2008 || Mount Lemmon || Mount Lemmon Survey ||  || align=right | 1.5 km || 
|-id=489 bgcolor=#E9E9E9
| 556489 ||  || — || August 19, 2006 || Mount Lemmon || Spacewatch ||  || align=right | 1.1 km || 
|-id=490 bgcolor=#d6d6d6
| 556490 ||  || — || July 4, 2014 || Haleakala || Pan-STARRS ||  || align=right | 2.3 km || 
|-id=491 bgcolor=#d6d6d6
| 556491 ||  || — || September 25, 2003 || Palomar || NEAT ||  || align=right | 3.2 km || 
|-id=492 bgcolor=#E9E9E9
| 556492 ||  || — || June 3, 2014 || Haleakala || Pan-STARRS ||  || align=right | 1.1 km || 
|-id=493 bgcolor=#E9E9E9
| 556493 ||  || — || June 3, 2014 || Haleakala || Pan-STARRS ||  || align=right | 1.6 km || 
|-id=494 bgcolor=#E9E9E9
| 556494 ||  || — || September 6, 2010 || Mount Lemmon || Mount Lemmon Survey ||  || align=right data-sort-value="0.97" | 970 m || 
|-id=495 bgcolor=#d6d6d6
| 556495 ||  || — || August 18, 2014 || Haleakala || Pan-STARRS ||  || align=right | 1.9 km || 
|-id=496 bgcolor=#E9E9E9
| 556496 ||  || — || June 1, 2014 || Haleakala || Pan-STARRS ||  || align=right data-sort-value="0.89" | 890 m || 
|-id=497 bgcolor=#E9E9E9
| 556497 ||  || — || June 30, 2014 || Mount Lemmon || Mount Lemmon Survey ||  || align=right data-sort-value="0.80" | 800 m || 
|-id=498 bgcolor=#E9E9E9
| 556498 ||  || — || September 4, 2010 || Mount Lemmon || Mount Lemmon Survey ||  || align=right | 1.5 km || 
|-id=499 bgcolor=#E9E9E9
| 556499 ||  || — || August 18, 2014 || Haleakala || Pan-STARRS ||  || align=right | 1.4 km || 
|-id=500 bgcolor=#fefefe
| 556500 ||  || — || February 5, 2013 || Kitt Peak || Spacewatch ||  || align=right data-sort-value="0.70" | 700 m || 
|}

556501–556600 

|-bgcolor=#E9E9E9
| 556501 ||  || — || October 2, 2006 || Kitt Peak || Spacewatch ||  || align=right data-sort-value="0.61" | 610 m || 
|-id=502 bgcolor=#fefefe
| 556502 ||  || — || August 18, 2014 || Haleakala || Pan-STARRS || H || align=right data-sort-value="0.54" | 540 m || 
|-id=503 bgcolor=#E9E9E9
| 556503 ||  || — || September 20, 2006 || Mount Lemmon || Spacewatch ||  || align=right data-sort-value="0.84" | 840 m || 
|-id=504 bgcolor=#fefefe
| 556504 ||  || — || August 6, 2014 || Haleakala || Pan-STARRS ||  || align=right data-sort-value="0.73" | 730 m || 
|-id=505 bgcolor=#E9E9E9
| 556505 ||  || — || July 11, 2010 || WISE || WISE ||  || align=right data-sort-value="0.87" | 870 m || 
|-id=506 bgcolor=#fefefe
| 556506 ||  || — || June 24, 2014 || Haleakala || Pan-STARRS ||  || align=right data-sort-value="0.72" | 720 m || 
|-id=507 bgcolor=#fefefe
| 556507 ||  || — || June 26, 2014 || Mount Lemmon || Mount Lemmon Survey ||  || align=right data-sort-value="0.81" | 810 m || 
|-id=508 bgcolor=#E9E9E9
| 556508 ||  || — || November 16, 2006 || Kitt Peak || Spacewatch ||  || align=right | 1.2 km || 
|-id=509 bgcolor=#fefefe
| 556509 ||  || — || November 18, 2003 || Palomar || NEAT ||  || align=right data-sort-value="0.86" | 860 m || 
|-id=510 bgcolor=#E9E9E9
| 556510 ||  || — || July 8, 2005 || Kitt Peak || Spacewatch ||  || align=right | 1.4 km || 
|-id=511 bgcolor=#E9E9E9
| 556511 ||  || — || September 16, 2010 || Mount Lemmon || Mount Lemmon Survey ||  || align=right | 1.4 km || 
|-id=512 bgcolor=#E9E9E9
| 556512 ||  || — || September 23, 2005 || Junk Bond || D. Healy ||  || align=right | 2.0 km || 
|-id=513 bgcolor=#fefefe
| 556513 ||  || — || July 30, 2001 || Palomar || NEAT || H || align=right data-sort-value="0.85" | 850 m || 
|-id=514 bgcolor=#fefefe
| 556514 ||  || — || July 7, 2014 || Haleakala || Pan-STARRS ||  || align=right data-sort-value="0.73" | 730 m || 
|-id=515 bgcolor=#E9E9E9
| 556515 ||  || — || October 14, 2010 || Mount Lemmon || Mount Lemmon Survey ||  || align=right | 1.1 km || 
|-id=516 bgcolor=#E9E9E9
| 556516 ||  || — || August 18, 2014 || Haleakala || Pan-STARRS ||  || align=right | 1.6 km || 
|-id=517 bgcolor=#E9E9E9
| 556517 ||  || — || November 12, 2010 || Mount Lemmon || Mount Lemmon Survey ||  || align=right | 1.5 km || 
|-id=518 bgcolor=#E9E9E9
| 556518 ||  || — || August 18, 2014 || Haleakala || Pan-STARRS ||  || align=right data-sort-value="0.91" | 910 m || 
|-id=519 bgcolor=#fefefe
| 556519 ||  || — || October 22, 2003 || Kitt Peak || Spacewatch ||  || align=right data-sort-value="0.77" | 770 m || 
|-id=520 bgcolor=#E9E9E9
| 556520 ||  || — || September 15, 2010 || Catalina || CSS ||  || align=right | 1.5 km || 
|-id=521 bgcolor=#E9E9E9
| 556521 ||  || — || April 10, 2005 || Kitt Peak || Spacewatch ||  || align=right | 1.4 km || 
|-id=522 bgcolor=#E9E9E9
| 556522 ||  || — || March 15, 2012 || Mount Lemmon || Mount Lemmon Survey ||  || align=right | 1.8 km || 
|-id=523 bgcolor=#E9E9E9
| 556523 ||  || — || November 4, 2002 || Palomar || NEAT ||  || align=right data-sort-value="0.80" | 800 m || 
|-id=524 bgcolor=#E9E9E9
| 556524 ||  || — || October 19, 2006 || Kitt Peak || L. H. Wasserman ||  || align=right | 1.2 km || 
|-id=525 bgcolor=#E9E9E9
| 556525 ||  || — || October 7, 2010 || Kitt Peak || Spacewatch ||  || align=right | 1.1 km || 
|-id=526 bgcolor=#E9E9E9
| 556526 ||  || — || March 13, 2013 || Palomar || PTF ||  || align=right data-sort-value="0.92" | 920 m || 
|-id=527 bgcolor=#E9E9E9
| 556527 ||  || — || July 7, 2014 || Haleakala || Pan-STARRS ||  || align=right | 1.7 km || 
|-id=528 bgcolor=#d6d6d6
| 556528 ||  || — || June 30, 2014 || Haleakala || Pan-STARRS ||  || align=right | 2.7 km || 
|-id=529 bgcolor=#fefefe
| 556529 ||  || — || October 8, 2007 || Mount Lemmon || Mount Lemmon Survey ||  || align=right data-sort-value="0.66" | 660 m || 
|-id=530 bgcolor=#d6d6d6
| 556530 ||  || — || March 19, 2013 || Haleakala || Pan-STARRS ||  || align=right | 1.9 km || 
|-id=531 bgcolor=#fefefe
| 556531 ||  || — || November 20, 2003 || Kitt Peak || Kitt Peak Obs. ||  || align=right data-sort-value="0.62" | 620 m || 
|-id=532 bgcolor=#fefefe
| 556532 ||  || — || June 29, 2014 || Haleakala || Pan-STARRS ||  || align=right data-sort-value="0.60" | 600 m || 
|-id=533 bgcolor=#fefefe
| 556533 ||  || — || November 12, 2007 || Mount Lemmon || Mount Lemmon Survey ||  || align=right data-sort-value="0.64" | 640 m || 
|-id=534 bgcolor=#E9E9E9
| 556534 ||  || — || July 1, 2014 || Haleakala || Pan-STARRS ||  || align=right | 1.4 km || 
|-id=535 bgcolor=#fefefe
| 556535 ||  || — || March 14, 2013 || Palomar || PTF ||  || align=right data-sort-value="0.81" | 810 m || 
|-id=536 bgcolor=#d6d6d6
| 556536 ||  || — || July 1, 2014 || Haleakala || Pan-STARRS ||  || align=right | 1.9 km || 
|-id=537 bgcolor=#E9E9E9
| 556537 ||  || — || August 22, 2006 || Cerro Tololo || L. H. Wasserman ||  || align=right | 1.2 km || 
|-id=538 bgcolor=#E9E9E9
| 556538 ||  || — || October 29, 2010 || Mount Lemmon || Mount Lemmon Survey ||  || align=right | 1.7 km || 
|-id=539 bgcolor=#E9E9E9
| 556539 ||  || — || September 25, 2006 || Kitt Peak || Spacewatch ||  || align=right | 1.3 km || 
|-id=540 bgcolor=#E9E9E9
| 556540 ||  || — || November 28, 2011 || Mount Lemmon || Mount Lemmon Survey ||  || align=right data-sort-value="0.94" | 940 m || 
|-id=541 bgcolor=#d6d6d6
| 556541 ||  || — || July 29, 2009 || Kitt Peak || Spacewatch ||  || align=right | 2.3 km || 
|-id=542 bgcolor=#fefefe
| 556542 ||  || — || October 13, 2007 || Mount Lemmon || Mount Lemmon Survey ||  || align=right data-sort-value="0.95" | 950 m || 
|-id=543 bgcolor=#fefefe
| 556543 ||  || — || April 30, 2006 || Kitt Peak || Spacewatch ||  || align=right data-sort-value="0.67" | 670 m || 
|-id=544 bgcolor=#E9E9E9
| 556544 ||  || — || April 16, 2013 || Cerro Tololo-DECam || CTIO-DECam ||  || align=right data-sort-value="0.91" | 910 m || 
|-id=545 bgcolor=#fefefe
| 556545 ||  || — || September 10, 2007 || Mount Lemmon || Mount Lemmon Survey ||  || align=right data-sort-value="0.88" | 880 m || 
|-id=546 bgcolor=#E9E9E9
| 556546 ||  || — || August 20, 2014 || Haleakala || Pan-STARRS ||  || align=right data-sort-value="0.81" | 810 m || 
|-id=547 bgcolor=#E9E9E9
| 556547 ||  || — || January 3, 2012 || Mount Lemmon || Mount Lemmon Survey ||  || align=right | 2.6 km || 
|-id=548 bgcolor=#E9E9E9
| 556548 ||  || — || April 10, 2013 || Mount Lemmon || Mount Lemmon Survey ||  || align=right data-sort-value="0.86" | 860 m || 
|-id=549 bgcolor=#fefefe
| 556549 ||  || — || January 18, 2009 || Kitt Peak || Spacewatch ||  || align=right data-sort-value="0.86" | 860 m || 
|-id=550 bgcolor=#E9E9E9
| 556550 ||  || — || December 25, 2011 || Mount Lemmon || Mount Lemmon Survey ||  || align=right | 1.5 km || 
|-id=551 bgcolor=#E9E9E9
| 556551 ||  || — || February 6, 2007 || Mount Lemmon || Mount Lemmon Survey ||  || align=right | 1.9 km || 
|-id=552 bgcolor=#fefefe
| 556552 ||  || — || October 1, 2003 || Kitt Peak || Spacewatch ||  || align=right data-sort-value="0.57" | 570 m || 
|-id=553 bgcolor=#E9E9E9
| 556553 ||  || — || March 15, 2013 || Catalina || CSS ||  || align=right | 1.1 km || 
|-id=554 bgcolor=#E9E9E9
| 556554 ||  || — || October 26, 2011 || Haleakala || Pan-STARRS ||  || align=right data-sort-value="0.85" | 850 m || 
|-id=555 bgcolor=#E9E9E9
| 556555 ||  || — || March 15, 2013 || Mount Lemmon || Mount Lemmon Survey ||  || align=right | 1.5 km || 
|-id=556 bgcolor=#d6d6d6
| 556556 ||  || — || February 25, 2011 || Mount Lemmon || Mount Lemmon Survey || 7:4 || align=right | 2.7 km || 
|-id=557 bgcolor=#E9E9E9
| 556557 ||  || — || September 2, 2010 || Mount Lemmon || Mount Lemmon Survey ||  || align=right data-sort-value="0.87" | 870 m || 
|-id=558 bgcolor=#E9E9E9
| 556558 ||  || — || March 15, 2004 || Kitt Peak || Spacewatch ||  || align=right | 1.0 km || 
|-id=559 bgcolor=#fefefe
| 556559 ||  || — || January 16, 2005 || Mauna Kea || Mauna Kea Obs. || MAS || align=right data-sort-value="0.66" | 660 m || 
|-id=560 bgcolor=#fefefe
| 556560 ||  || — || July 26, 2014 || Kitt Peak || Pan-STARRS ||  || align=right data-sort-value="0.70" | 700 m || 
|-id=561 bgcolor=#E9E9E9
| 556561 ||  || — || August 18, 2006 || Kitt Peak || Spacewatch ||  || align=right data-sort-value="0.73" | 730 m || 
|-id=562 bgcolor=#E9E9E9
| 556562 ||  || — || February 22, 2004 || Kitt Peak || Spacewatch ||  || align=right data-sort-value="0.78" | 780 m || 
|-id=563 bgcolor=#E9E9E9
| 556563 ||  || — || August 20, 2014 || Haleakala || Pan-STARRS ||  || align=right data-sort-value="0.80" | 800 m || 
|-id=564 bgcolor=#E9E9E9
| 556564 ||  || — || August 20, 2001 || Cerro Tololo || Cerro Tololo Obs. ||  || align=right | 1.1 km || 
|-id=565 bgcolor=#E9E9E9
| 556565 ||  || — || July 10, 2005 || Kitt Peak || Spacewatch ||  || align=right | 1.5 km || 
|-id=566 bgcolor=#E9E9E9
| 556566 ||  || — || February 22, 2012 || Kitt Peak || Spacewatch ||  || align=right | 1.6 km || 
|-id=567 bgcolor=#E9E9E9
| 556567 ||  || — || August 22, 2014 || Haleakala || Pan-STARRS ||  || align=right | 1.4 km || 
|-id=568 bgcolor=#E9E9E9
| 556568 ||  || — || January 12, 2008 || Lulin || LUSS ||  || align=right | 1.1 km || 
|-id=569 bgcolor=#E9E9E9
| 556569 ||  || — || April 11, 2013 || Kitt Peak || Spacewatch ||  || align=right | 2.4 km || 
|-id=570 bgcolor=#E9E9E9
| 556570 ||  || — || August 13, 2010 || Kitt Peak || Spacewatch ||  || align=right | 1.2 km || 
|-id=571 bgcolor=#fefefe
| 556571 ||  || — || October 15, 2007 || Mount Lemmon || Mount Lemmon Survey ||  || align=right data-sort-value="0.62" | 620 m || 
|-id=572 bgcolor=#fefefe
| 556572 ||  || — || January 5, 2013 || Kitt Peak || Spacewatch ||  || align=right data-sort-value="0.75" | 750 m || 
|-id=573 bgcolor=#fefefe
| 556573 ||  || — || October 26, 2011 || Haleakala || Pan-STARRS ||  || align=right data-sort-value="0.76" | 760 m || 
|-id=574 bgcolor=#fefefe
| 556574 ||  || — || September 19, 2003 || Kitt Peak || Spacewatch ||  || align=right data-sort-value="0.66" | 660 m || 
|-id=575 bgcolor=#fefefe
| 556575 ||  || — || May 24, 2011 || Haleakala || Pan-STARRS || H || align=right data-sort-value="0.56" | 560 m || 
|-id=576 bgcolor=#fefefe
| 556576 ||  || — || August 20, 2014 || Haleakala || Pan-STARRS ||  || align=right data-sort-value="0.49" | 490 m || 
|-id=577 bgcolor=#fefefe
| 556577 ||  || — || July 30, 2014 || Kitt Peak || Spacewatch || H || align=right data-sort-value="0.52" | 520 m || 
|-id=578 bgcolor=#d6d6d6
| 556578 ||  || — || February 25, 2007 || Mount Lemmon || Mount Lemmon Survey ||  || align=right | 2.1 km || 
|-id=579 bgcolor=#E9E9E9
| 556579 ||  || — || April 1, 2009 || Kitt Peak || Spacewatch ||  || align=right data-sort-value="0.79" | 790 m || 
|-id=580 bgcolor=#E9E9E9
| 556580 ||  || — || October 11, 2010 || Mount Lemmon || Mount Lemmon Survey ||  || align=right | 1.2 km || 
|-id=581 bgcolor=#fefefe
| 556581 ||  || — || February 9, 2013 || Haleakala || Pan-STARRS ||  || align=right data-sort-value="0.59" | 590 m || 
|-id=582 bgcolor=#E9E9E9
| 556582 ||  || — || August 22, 2014 || Haleakala || Pan-STARRS ||  || align=right | 1.2 km || 
|-id=583 bgcolor=#E9E9E9
| 556583 ||  || — || August 28, 2006 || Catalina || CSS ||  || align=right data-sort-value="0.75" | 750 m || 
|-id=584 bgcolor=#E9E9E9
| 556584 ||  || — || August 22, 2014 || Haleakala || Pan-STARRS ||  || align=right data-sort-value="0.89" | 890 m || 
|-id=585 bgcolor=#E9E9E9
| 556585 ||  || — || April 15, 2013 || Haleakala || Pan-STARRS ||  || align=right | 1.3 km || 
|-id=586 bgcolor=#E9E9E9
| 556586 ||  || — || December 20, 2007 || Mount Lemmon || Mount Lemmon Survey ||  || align=right | 2.2 km || 
|-id=587 bgcolor=#E9E9E9
| 556587 ||  || — || December 31, 2007 || Kitt Peak || Spacewatch ||  || align=right data-sort-value="0.76" | 760 m || 
|-id=588 bgcolor=#fefefe
| 556588 ||  || — || December 31, 2008 || Kitt Peak || Spacewatch ||  || align=right data-sort-value="0.86" | 860 m || 
|-id=589 bgcolor=#E9E9E9
| 556589 ||  || — || August 22, 2014 || Haleakala || Pan-STARRS ||  || align=right | 1.2 km || 
|-id=590 bgcolor=#fefefe
| 556590 ||  || — || February 15, 2013 || Haleakala || Pan-STARRS ||  || align=right data-sort-value="0.77" | 770 m || 
|-id=591 bgcolor=#E9E9E9
| 556591 ||  || — || September 18, 2010 || Mount Lemmon || Mount Lemmon Survey ||  || align=right | 1.1 km || 
|-id=592 bgcolor=#E9E9E9
| 556592 ||  || — || October 29, 2010 || Catalina || CSS ||  || align=right | 1.4 km || 
|-id=593 bgcolor=#d6d6d6
| 556593 ||  || — || August 3, 2014 || Haleakala || Pan-STARRS ||  || align=right | 1.9 km || 
|-id=594 bgcolor=#d6d6d6
| 556594 ||  || — || August 22, 2014 || Haleakala || Pan-STARRS ||  || align=right | 2.1 km || 
|-id=595 bgcolor=#E9E9E9
| 556595 ||  || — || September 15, 2006 || Kitt Peak || Spacewatch ||  || align=right data-sort-value="0.83" | 830 m || 
|-id=596 bgcolor=#E9E9E9
| 556596 ||  || — || September 18, 2001 || Kitt Peak || Spacewatch ||  || align=right | 1.1 km || 
|-id=597 bgcolor=#E9E9E9
| 556597 ||  || — || October 2, 2010 || Kitt Peak || Spacewatch ||  || align=right data-sort-value="0.78" | 780 m || 
|-id=598 bgcolor=#E9E9E9
| 556598 ||  || — || July 30, 2014 || Kitt Peak || Spacewatch ||  || align=right data-sort-value="0.76" | 760 m || 
|-id=599 bgcolor=#E9E9E9
| 556599 ||  || — || September 17, 2006 || Kitt Peak || Spacewatch ||  || align=right data-sort-value="0.96" | 960 m || 
|-id=600 bgcolor=#fefefe
| 556600 ||  || — || April 12, 2013 || Haleakala || Pan-STARRS ||  || align=right data-sort-value="0.81" | 810 m || 
|}

556601–556700 

|-bgcolor=#E9E9E9
| 556601 ||  || — || April 10, 2000 || Kitt Peak || Kitt Peak Obs. ||  || align=right | 1.3 km || 
|-id=602 bgcolor=#E9E9E9
| 556602 ||  || — || January 10, 2008 || Mount Lemmon || Mount Lemmon Survey ||  || align=right | 1.2 km || 
|-id=603 bgcolor=#fefefe
| 556603 ||  || — || July 5, 2010 || Kitt Peak || Spacewatch ||  || align=right data-sort-value="0.67" | 670 m || 
|-id=604 bgcolor=#fefefe
| 556604 ||  || — || December 16, 2003 || Kitt Peak || Spacewatch ||  || align=right data-sort-value="0.62" | 620 m || 
|-id=605 bgcolor=#fefefe
| 556605 ||  || — || August 22, 2014 || Haleakala || Pan-STARRS ||  || align=right data-sort-value="0.64" | 640 m || 
|-id=606 bgcolor=#E9E9E9
| 556606 ||  || — || April 1, 2009 || Cerro Burek || Alianza S4 Obs. ||  || align=right | 1.6 km || 
|-id=607 bgcolor=#E9E9E9
| 556607 ||  || — || September 30, 2006 || Kitt Peak || Spacewatch ||  || align=right data-sort-value="0.73" | 730 m || 
|-id=608 bgcolor=#E9E9E9
| 556608 ||  || — || August 20, 2014 || Haleakala || Pan-STARRS ||  || align=right | 1.0 km || 
|-id=609 bgcolor=#E9E9E9
| 556609 ||  || — || August 27, 2006 || Kitt Peak || Spacewatch ||  || align=right data-sort-value="0.53" | 530 m || 
|-id=610 bgcolor=#fefefe
| 556610 ||  || — || October 19, 2003 || Apache Point || SDSS Collaboration ||  || align=right data-sort-value="0.81" | 810 m || 
|-id=611 bgcolor=#fefefe
| 556611 ||  || — || August 20, 2014 || Haleakala || Pan-STARRS ||  || align=right data-sort-value="0.70" | 700 m || 
|-id=612 bgcolor=#E9E9E9
| 556612 ||  || — || November 8, 2010 || Mount Lemmon || Mount Lemmon Survey ||  || align=right | 1.7 km || 
|-id=613 bgcolor=#E9E9E9
| 556613 ||  || — || September 30, 2010 || Mount Lemmon || Mount Lemmon Survey ||  || align=right | 1.1 km || 
|-id=614 bgcolor=#E9E9E9
| 556614 ||  || — || August 22, 2014 || Haleakala || Pan-STARRS || DOR || align=right | 2.1 km || 
|-id=615 bgcolor=#E9E9E9
| 556615 ||  || — || May 16, 2009 || Mount Lemmon || Mount Lemmon Survey ||  || align=right | 1.4 km || 
|-id=616 bgcolor=#E9E9E9
| 556616 ||  || — || April 15, 2008 || Mount Lemmon || Mount Lemmon Survey ||  || align=right | 2.3 km || 
|-id=617 bgcolor=#E9E9E9
| 556617 ||  || — || January 10, 2007 || Mount Lemmon || Mount Lemmon Survey ||  || align=right | 1.6 km || 
|-id=618 bgcolor=#E9E9E9
| 556618 ||  || — || August 22, 2014 || Haleakala || Pan-STARRS ||  || align=right | 2.1 km || 
|-id=619 bgcolor=#E9E9E9
| 556619 ||  || — || August 22, 2014 || Haleakala || Pan-STARRS ||  || align=right | 1.7 km || 
|-id=620 bgcolor=#E9E9E9
| 556620 ||  || — || September 30, 2006 || Mount Lemmon || SDSS ||  || align=right | 1.5 km || 
|-id=621 bgcolor=#E9E9E9
| 556621 ||  || — || January 26, 2003 || Palomar || NEAT ||  || align=right | 1.7 km || 
|-id=622 bgcolor=#E9E9E9
| 556622 ||  || — || August 22, 2014 || Haleakala || Pan-STARRS ||  || align=right | 1.1 km || 
|-id=623 bgcolor=#E9E9E9
| 556623 ||  || — || August 22, 2014 || Haleakala || Pan-STARRS ||  || align=right data-sort-value="0.80" | 800 m || 
|-id=624 bgcolor=#E9E9E9
| 556624 ||  || — || October 2, 2010 || Mount Lemmon || Mount Lemmon Survey ||  || align=right | 1.8 km || 
|-id=625 bgcolor=#E9E9E9
| 556625 ||  || — || December 30, 2007 || Kitt Peak || Spacewatch ||  || align=right | 1.1 km || 
|-id=626 bgcolor=#E9E9E9
| 556626 ||  || — || October 30, 2010 || Mount Lemmon || Mount Lemmon Survey ||  || align=right | 1.1 km || 
|-id=627 bgcolor=#E9E9E9
| 556627 ||  || — || August 6, 2005 || Siding Spring || SSS ||  || align=right | 1.7 km || 
|-id=628 bgcolor=#E9E9E9
| 556628 ||  || — || August 29, 2006 || Kitt Peak || Spacewatch ||  || align=right data-sort-value="0.62" | 620 m || 
|-id=629 bgcolor=#E9E9E9
| 556629 ||  || — || August 22, 2014 || Haleakala || Pan-STARRS ||  || align=right data-sort-value="0.99" | 990 m || 
|-id=630 bgcolor=#fefefe
| 556630 ||  || — || August 24, 2014 || Haleakala || Pan-STARRS || H || align=right data-sort-value="0.53" | 530 m || 
|-id=631 bgcolor=#fefefe
| 556631 ||  || — || September 26, 2003 || Apache Point || SDSS Collaboration ||  || align=right data-sort-value="0.83" | 830 m || 
|-id=632 bgcolor=#E9E9E9
| 556632 ||  || — || August 25, 2014 || Haleakala || Pan-STARRS ||  || align=right data-sort-value="0.91" | 910 m || 
|-id=633 bgcolor=#d6d6d6
| 556633 ||  || — || August 25, 2014 || Haleakala || Pan-STARRS ||  || align=right | 2.2 km || 
|-id=634 bgcolor=#E9E9E9
| 556634 ||  || — || November 2, 2010 || Mount Lemmon || Mount Lemmon Survey ||  || align=right | 1.4 km || 
|-id=635 bgcolor=#E9E9E9
| 556635 ||  || — || May 1, 2009 || Mount Lemmon || Mount Lemmon Survey ||  || align=right | 1.5 km || 
|-id=636 bgcolor=#E9E9E9
| 556636 ||  || — || August 25, 2014 || Haleakala || Pan-STARRS ||  || align=right | 1.4 km || 
|-id=637 bgcolor=#E9E9E9
| 556637 ||  || — || October 20, 2006 || Mount Lemmon || Mount Lemmon Survey ||  || align=right | 1.4 km || 
|-id=638 bgcolor=#E9E9E9
| 556638 ||  || — || November 18, 2006 || Kitt Peak || Spacewatch ||  || align=right | 1.5 km || 
|-id=639 bgcolor=#E9E9E9
| 556639 ||  || — || August 25, 2014 || Haleakala || Pan-STARRS ||  || align=right | 1.3 km || 
|-id=640 bgcolor=#E9E9E9
| 556640 ||  || — || August 25, 2014 || Haleakala || Pan-STARRS ||  || align=right | 2.0 km || 
|-id=641 bgcolor=#E9E9E9
| 556641 ||  || — || August 22, 2014 || Haleakala || Pan-STARRS ||  || align=right | 1.8 km || 
|-id=642 bgcolor=#E9E9E9
| 556642 ||  || — || May 9, 2013 || Haleakala || Pan-STARRS ||  || align=right | 2.5 km || 
|-id=643 bgcolor=#E9E9E9
| 556643 ||  || — || August 29, 2006 || Catalina || CSS ||  || align=right data-sort-value="0.84" | 840 m || 
|-id=644 bgcolor=#d6d6d6
| 556644 ||  || — || November 22, 2005 || Kitt Peak || Spacewatch ||  || align=right | 2.1 km || 
|-id=645 bgcolor=#E9E9E9
| 556645 ||  || — || November 13, 2007 || Mount Lemmon || Mount Lemmon Survey ||  || align=right | 1.6 km || 
|-id=646 bgcolor=#E9E9E9
| 556646 ||  || — || March 19, 2013 || Palomar || PTF ||  || align=right data-sort-value="0.94" | 940 m || 
|-id=647 bgcolor=#E9E9E9
| 556647 ||  || — || January 19, 2008 || Mount Lemmon || Mount Lemmon Survey ||  || align=right | 1.1 km || 
|-id=648 bgcolor=#E9E9E9
| 556648 ||  || — || July 30, 2014 || Haleakala || Pan-STARRS ||  || align=right | 1.3 km || 
|-id=649 bgcolor=#E9E9E9
| 556649 ||  || — || September 30, 2005 || Mount Lemmon || Mount Lemmon Survey ||  || align=right | 1.3 km || 
|-id=650 bgcolor=#E9E9E9
| 556650 ||  || — || October 6, 2005 || Kitt Peak || Spacewatch ||  || align=right | 1.9 km || 
|-id=651 bgcolor=#E9E9E9
| 556651 ||  || — || November 16, 2010 || Mount Lemmon || Mount Lemmon Survey ||  || align=right | 1.4 km || 
|-id=652 bgcolor=#E9E9E9
| 556652 ||  || — || September 30, 2005 || Kitt Peak || Spacewatch ||  || align=right | 2.2 km || 
|-id=653 bgcolor=#E9E9E9
| 556653 ||  || — || August 25, 2014 || Haleakala || Pan-STARRS || MAR || align=right data-sort-value="0.63" | 630 m || 
|-id=654 bgcolor=#fefefe
| 556654 ||  || — || March 5, 2013 || Catalina || CSS || H || align=right data-sort-value="0.50" | 500 m || 
|-id=655 bgcolor=#E9E9E9
| 556655 ||  || — || August 25, 2014 || Haleakala || Pan-STARRS ||  || align=right | 1.2 km || 
|-id=656 bgcolor=#E9E9E9
| 556656 ||  || — || August 30, 2005 || Kitt Peak || Spacewatch ||  || align=right | 1.4 km || 
|-id=657 bgcolor=#fefefe
| 556657 ||  || — || July 28, 2003 || Palomar || NEAT ||  || align=right data-sort-value="0.98" | 980 m || 
|-id=658 bgcolor=#E9E9E9
| 556658 ||  || — || March 16, 2012 || Haleakala || Pan-STARRS ||  || align=right | 1.6 km || 
|-id=659 bgcolor=#E9E9E9
| 556659 ||  || — || August 25, 2014 || Haleakala || Pan-STARRS ||  || align=right | 1.0 km || 
|-id=660 bgcolor=#E9E9E9
| 556660 ||  || — || November 1, 2010 || Mount Lemmon || Mount Lemmon Survey ||  || align=right | 1.4 km || 
|-id=661 bgcolor=#d6d6d6
| 556661 ||  || — || March 16, 2012 || Catalina || CSS ||  || align=right | 2.5 km || 
|-id=662 bgcolor=#E9E9E9
| 556662 ||  || — || October 2, 2010 || Mount Lemmon || Mount Lemmon Survey ||  || align=right | 1.1 km || 
|-id=663 bgcolor=#E9E9E9
| 556663 ||  || — || July 1, 2014 || Haleakala || Pan-STARRS ||  || align=right data-sort-value="0.98" | 980 m || 
|-id=664 bgcolor=#d6d6d6
| 556664 ||  || — || July 28, 2014 || Haleakala || Pan-STARRS || 7:4 || align=right | 3.2 km || 
|-id=665 bgcolor=#fefefe
| 556665 ||  || — || August 15, 2014 || Haleakala || Pan-STARRS ||  || align=right data-sort-value="0.63" | 630 m || 
|-id=666 bgcolor=#fefefe
| 556666 ||  || — || May 6, 2006 || Kitt Peak || Spacewatch ||  || align=right data-sort-value="0.60" | 600 m || 
|-id=667 bgcolor=#fefefe
| 556667 ||  || — || October 8, 2007 || Mount Lemmon || Mount Lemmon Survey ||  || align=right data-sort-value="0.53" | 530 m || 
|-id=668 bgcolor=#fefefe
| 556668 ||  || — || March 21, 2001 || Kitt Peak || Kitt Peak Obs. ||  || align=right data-sort-value="0.63" | 630 m || 
|-id=669 bgcolor=#fefefe
| 556669 ||  || — || July 28, 2014 || Haleakala || Pan-STARRS ||  || align=right data-sort-value="0.77" | 770 m || 
|-id=670 bgcolor=#fefefe
| 556670 ||  || — || June 3, 2014 || Haleakala || Pan-STARRS ||  || align=right data-sort-value="0.73" | 730 m || 
|-id=671 bgcolor=#E9E9E9
| 556671 ||  || — || August 3, 2014 || Haleakala || Pan-STARRS ||  || align=right data-sort-value="0.69" | 690 m || 
|-id=672 bgcolor=#E9E9E9
| 556672 ||  || — || December 29, 2011 || Mount Lemmon || Mount Lemmon Survey ||  || align=right | 1.0 km || 
|-id=673 bgcolor=#d6d6d6
| 556673 ||  || — || August 26, 2014 || Haleakala || Pan-STARRS ||  || align=right | 2.6 km || 
|-id=674 bgcolor=#E9E9E9
| 556674 ||  || — || August 30, 2005 || Palomar || NEAT ||  || align=right | 2.1 km || 
|-id=675 bgcolor=#d6d6d6
| 556675 ||  || — || September 20, 2009 || Mount Lemmon || Mount Lemmon Survey ||  || align=right | 1.9 km || 
|-id=676 bgcolor=#E9E9E9
| 556676 ||  || — || January 29, 2007 || Kitt Peak || Spacewatch ||  || align=right | 1.8 km || 
|-id=677 bgcolor=#E9E9E9
| 556677 ||  || — || April 10, 2013 || Haleakala || Pan-STARRS ||  || align=right | 1.3 km || 
|-id=678 bgcolor=#E9E9E9
| 556678 ||  || — || September 29, 2005 || Kitt Peak || Spacewatch ||  || align=right | 1.9 km || 
|-id=679 bgcolor=#E9E9E9
| 556679 ||  || — || February 28, 2008 || Kitt Peak || Mount Lemmon Survey ||  || align=right | 1.2 km || 
|-id=680 bgcolor=#E9E9E9
| 556680 ||  || — || August 27, 2014 || Haleakala || Pan-STARRS ||  || align=right | 1.1 km || 
|-id=681 bgcolor=#E9E9E9
| 556681 ||  || — || September 18, 2010 || Mount Lemmon || Mount Lemmon Survey ||  || align=right | 1.4 km || 
|-id=682 bgcolor=#E9E9E9
| 556682 ||  || — || March 14, 2012 || Mount Lemmon || Mount Lemmon Survey ||  || align=right | 1.5 km || 
|-id=683 bgcolor=#d6d6d6
| 556683 ||  || — || August 27, 2014 || Haleakala || Pan-STARRS || BRA || align=right | 1.1 km || 
|-id=684 bgcolor=#E9E9E9
| 556684 ||  || — || August 27, 2014 || Haleakala || Pan-STARRS ||  || align=right | 1.2 km || 
|-id=685 bgcolor=#fefefe
| 556685 ||  || — || August 28, 2014 || Kitt Peak || Spacewatch ||  || align=right data-sort-value="0.67" | 670 m || 
|-id=686 bgcolor=#fefefe
| 556686 ||  || — || June 24, 2014 || Haleakala || Pan-STARRS || H || align=right data-sort-value="0.76" | 760 m || 
|-id=687 bgcolor=#FA8072
| 556687 ||  || — || July 31, 2014 || Haleakala || Pan-STARRS || H || align=right data-sort-value="0.50" | 500 m || 
|-id=688 bgcolor=#E9E9E9
| 556688 ||  || — || August 25, 2014 || Haleakala || Pan-STARRS ||  || align=right | 1.3 km || 
|-id=689 bgcolor=#E9E9E9
| 556689 ||  || — || March 14, 2012 || Mount Lemmon || Mount Lemmon Survey ||  || align=right | 1.1 km || 
|-id=690 bgcolor=#E9E9E9
| 556690 ||  || — || January 29, 2011 || Mount Lemmon || Mount Lemmon Survey ||  || align=right | 2.0 km || 
|-id=691 bgcolor=#E9E9E9
| 556691 ||  || — || September 11, 2005 || Kitt Peak || Spacewatch ||  || align=right | 1.4 km || 
|-id=692 bgcolor=#E9E9E9
| 556692 ||  || — || August 25, 2014 || Haleakala || Pan-STARRS ||  || align=right | 1.3 km || 
|-id=693 bgcolor=#E9E9E9
| 556693 ||  || — || February 7, 2008 || Kitt Peak || Spacewatch ||  || align=right | 1.5 km || 
|-id=694 bgcolor=#E9E9E9
| 556694 ||  || — || August 27, 2014 || Haleakala || Pan-STARRS ||  || align=right data-sort-value="0.63" | 630 m || 
|-id=695 bgcolor=#fefefe
| 556695 ||  || — || July 31, 2014 || Haleakala || Pan-STARRS || H || align=right data-sort-value="0.65" | 650 m || 
|-id=696 bgcolor=#fefefe
| 556696 ||  || — || August 27, 2014 || Haleakala || Pan-STARRS || H || align=right data-sort-value="0.39" | 390 m || 
|-id=697 bgcolor=#fefefe
| 556697 ||  || — || July 29, 2014 || Haleakala || Pan-STARRS || H || align=right data-sort-value="0.53" | 530 m || 
|-id=698 bgcolor=#E9E9E9
| 556698 ||  || — || August 27, 2014 || Haleakala || Pan-STARRS ||  || align=right data-sort-value="0.71" | 710 m || 
|-id=699 bgcolor=#E9E9E9
| 556699 ||  || — || July 8, 2014 || Haleakala || Pan-STARRS ||  || align=right data-sort-value="0.94" | 940 m || 
|-id=700 bgcolor=#E9E9E9
| 556700 ||  || — || September 25, 2006 || Kitt Peak || Spacewatch ||  || align=right data-sort-value="0.73" | 730 m || 
|}

556701–556800 

|-bgcolor=#E9E9E9
| 556701 ||  || — || December 25, 2010 || Mount Lemmon || Mount Lemmon Survey ||  || align=right | 2.1 km || 
|-id=702 bgcolor=#fefefe
| 556702 ||  || — || July 25, 2014 || Haleakala || Pan-STARRS ||  || align=right data-sort-value="0.60" | 600 m || 
|-id=703 bgcolor=#E9E9E9
| 556703 ||  || — || April 10, 2013 || Haleakala || Pan-STARRS ||  || align=right data-sort-value="0.98" | 980 m || 
|-id=704 bgcolor=#fefefe
| 556704 ||  || — || October 10, 2004 || Kitt Peak || Spacewatch || H || align=right data-sort-value="0.63" | 630 m || 
|-id=705 bgcolor=#fefefe
| 556705 ||  || — || August 31, 2014 || Mount Lemmon || Mount Lemmon Survey || H || align=right data-sort-value="0.53" | 530 m || 
|-id=706 bgcolor=#fefefe
| 556706 ||  || — || June 24, 2011 || Nogales || M. Schwartz, P. R. Holvorcem || H || align=right data-sort-value="0.89" | 890 m || 
|-id=707 bgcolor=#E9E9E9
| 556707 ||  || — || August 27, 2014 || Haleakala || Pan-STARRS ||  || align=right | 1.5 km || 
|-id=708 bgcolor=#fefefe
| 556708 ||  || — || February 14, 2013 || Kitt Peak || Spacewatch ||  || align=right data-sort-value="0.69" | 690 m || 
|-id=709 bgcolor=#E9E9E9
| 556709 ||  || — || August 28, 2014 || Haleakala || Pan-STARRS ||  || align=right | 1.9 km || 
|-id=710 bgcolor=#E9E9E9
| 556710 ||  || — || January 21, 2013 || Haleakala || Pan-STARRS ||  || align=right | 1.1 km || 
|-id=711 bgcolor=#E9E9E9
| 556711 ||  || — || October 17, 2010 || Mount Lemmon || Mount Lemmon Survey ||  || align=right | 1.7 km || 
|-id=712 bgcolor=#E9E9E9
| 556712 ||  || — || August 31, 2005 || Kitt Peak || Spacewatch ||  || align=right | 2.6 km || 
|-id=713 bgcolor=#E9E9E9
| 556713 ||  || — || September 17, 2006 || Kitt Peak || Spacewatch ||  || align=right | 1.1 km || 
|-id=714 bgcolor=#E9E9E9
| 556714 ||  || — || August 29, 2014 || Kitt Peak || Spacewatch || EUN || align=right data-sort-value="0.83" | 830 m || 
|-id=715 bgcolor=#E9E9E9
| 556715 ||  || — || May 4, 2009 || Mount Lemmon || Mount Lemmon Survey ||  || align=right data-sort-value="0.98" | 980 m || 
|-id=716 bgcolor=#fefefe
| 556716 ||  || — || June 26, 2014 || Haleakala || Pan-STARRS || NYS || align=right data-sort-value="0.64" | 640 m || 
|-id=717 bgcolor=#E9E9E9
| 556717 ||  || — || July 30, 2014 || Kitt Peak || Spacewatch ||  || align=right | 1.2 km || 
|-id=718 bgcolor=#E9E9E9
| 556718 ||  || — || September 5, 2010 || Mount Lemmon || Mount Lemmon Survey ||  || align=right | 1.4 km || 
|-id=719 bgcolor=#fefefe
| 556719 ||  || — || March 19, 2013 || Haleakala || Pan-STARRS ||  || align=right data-sort-value="0.77" | 770 m || 
|-id=720 bgcolor=#E9E9E9
| 556720 ||  || — || March 10, 2003 || Kitt Peak || Spacewatch ||  || align=right | 2.1 km || 
|-id=721 bgcolor=#E9E9E9
| 556721 ||  || — || January 21, 2012 || Kitt Peak || Spacewatch ||  || align=right data-sort-value="0.92" | 920 m || 
|-id=722 bgcolor=#E9E9E9
| 556722 ||  || — || September 12, 2001 || Kitt Peak || L. H. Wasserman, E. L. Ryan ||  || align=right | 1.7 km || 
|-id=723 bgcolor=#E9E9E9
| 556723 ||  || — || July 7, 2014 || Haleakala || Pan-STARRS ||  || align=right data-sort-value="0.65" | 650 m || 
|-id=724 bgcolor=#fefefe
| 556724 ||  || — || September 12, 2007 || Mount Lemmon || Mount Lemmon Survey ||  || align=right data-sort-value="0.62" | 620 m || 
|-id=725 bgcolor=#E9E9E9
| 556725 ||  || — || October 9, 2010 || Mount Lemmon || Mount Lemmon Survey ||  || align=right data-sort-value="0.86" | 860 m || 
|-id=726 bgcolor=#E9E9E9
| 556726 ||  || — || October 22, 2005 || Kitt Peak || Spacewatch ||  || align=right | 2.3 km || 
|-id=727 bgcolor=#E9E9E9
| 556727 ||  || — || October 26, 2005 || Kitt Peak || Spacewatch ||  || align=right | 2.3 km || 
|-id=728 bgcolor=#d6d6d6
| 556728 ||  || — || July 16, 2013 || Haleakala || Pan-STARRS ||  || align=right | 2.6 km || 
|-id=729 bgcolor=#E9E9E9
| 556729 ||  || — || January 31, 2008 || Mount Lemmon || Mount Lemmon Survey ||  || align=right | 1.7 km || 
|-id=730 bgcolor=#E9E9E9
| 556730 ||  || — || August 25, 2014 || Haleakala || Pan-STARRS ||  || align=right | 2.0 km || 
|-id=731 bgcolor=#E9E9E9
| 556731 ||  || — || August 28, 2014 || Haleakala || Pan-STARRS ||  || align=right | 1.2 km || 
|-id=732 bgcolor=#E9E9E9
| 556732 ||  || — || July 28, 2005 || Palomar || NEAT ||  || align=right | 2.0 km || 
|-id=733 bgcolor=#E9E9E9
| 556733 ||  || — || January 2, 2012 || Kitt Peak || Spacewatch ||  || align=right | 1.00 km || 
|-id=734 bgcolor=#E9E9E9
| 556734 ||  || — || November 8, 2010 || Mount Lemmon || Mount Lemmon Survey ||  || align=right | 1.8 km || 
|-id=735 bgcolor=#E9E9E9
| 556735 ||  || — || October 31, 2006 || Mount Lemmon || Mount Lemmon Survey ||  || align=right | 1.3 km || 
|-id=736 bgcolor=#E9E9E9
| 556736 ||  || — || November 18, 2006 || Mount Lemmon || Mount Lemmon Survey ||  || align=right | 1.4 km || 
|-id=737 bgcolor=#E9E9E9
| 556737 ||  || — || December 12, 2006 || Mount Lemmon || Mount Lemmon Survey ||  || align=right | 1.2 km || 
|-id=738 bgcolor=#E9E9E9
| 556738 ||  || — || August 30, 2014 || Haleakala || Pan-STARRS ||  || align=right | 1.9 km || 
|-id=739 bgcolor=#E9E9E9
| 556739 ||  || — || October 23, 2006 || Mount Lemmon || Mount Lemmon Survey ||  || align=right data-sort-value="0.90" | 900 m || 
|-id=740 bgcolor=#E9E9E9
| 556740 ||  || — || March 13, 2007 || Mount Lemmon || Mount Lemmon Survey ||  || align=right | 1.9 km || 
|-id=741 bgcolor=#E9E9E9
| 556741 ||  || — || August 28, 2014 || Haleakala || Pan-STARRS ||  || align=right data-sort-value="0.81" | 810 m || 
|-id=742 bgcolor=#E9E9E9
| 556742 ||  || — || August 31, 2014 || Haleakala || Pan-STARRS ||  || align=right | 1.3 km || 
|-id=743 bgcolor=#E9E9E9
| 556743 ||  || — || August 30, 2009 || La Sagra || OAM Obs. ||  || align=right | 1.8 km || 
|-id=744 bgcolor=#E9E9E9
| 556744 ||  || — || April 22, 2009 || Mount Lemmon || Mount Lemmon Survey ||  || align=right data-sort-value="0.60" | 600 m || 
|-id=745 bgcolor=#E9E9E9
| 556745 ||  || — || August 22, 2014 || Haleakala || Pan-STARRS ||  || align=right | 1.1 km || 
|-id=746 bgcolor=#E9E9E9
| 556746 ||  || — || November 11, 2001 || Kitt Peak || SDSS ||  || align=right | 1.5 km || 
|-id=747 bgcolor=#E9E9E9
| 556747 ||  || — || May 15, 2013 || Haleakala || Pan-STARRS ||  || align=right | 1.5 km || 
|-id=748 bgcolor=#E9E9E9
| 556748 ||  || — || March 4, 2012 || Mount Lemmon || Mount Lemmon Survey ||  || align=right | 1.6 km || 
|-id=749 bgcolor=#E9E9E9
| 556749 ||  || — || March 13, 2012 || Mount Lemmon || Mount Lemmon Survey ||  || align=right | 1.6 km || 
|-id=750 bgcolor=#E9E9E9
| 556750 ||  || — || October 12, 2010 || Mount Lemmon || Mount Lemmon Survey ||  || align=right | 1.2 km || 
|-id=751 bgcolor=#E9E9E9
| 556751 ||  || — || October 9, 2010 || Mount Lemmon || Mount Lemmon Survey ||  || align=right | 1.1 km || 
|-id=752 bgcolor=#E9E9E9
| 556752 ||  || — || October 3, 2006 || Mount Lemmon || Mount Lemmon Survey ||  || align=right | 1.2 km || 
|-id=753 bgcolor=#E9E9E9
| 556753 ||  || — || November 14, 2010 || Catalina || CSS ||  || align=right data-sort-value="0.78" | 780 m || 
|-id=754 bgcolor=#E9E9E9
| 556754 ||  || — || August 23, 2014 || Haleakala || Pan-STARRS ||  || align=right | 2.1 km || 
|-id=755 bgcolor=#d6d6d6
| 556755 ||  || — || March 9, 2011 || Mount Lemmon || Mount Lemmon Survey ||  || align=right | 2.5 km || 
|-id=756 bgcolor=#E9E9E9
| 556756 ||  || — || August 28, 2005 || Kitt Peak || Spacewatch ||  || align=right | 1.5 km || 
|-id=757 bgcolor=#E9E9E9
| 556757 ||  || — || August 25, 2014 || Haleakala || Pan-STARRS ||  || align=right | 1.1 km || 
|-id=758 bgcolor=#E9E9E9
| 556758 ||  || — || August 25, 2014 || Haleakala || Pan-STARRS ||  || align=right | 1.6 km || 
|-id=759 bgcolor=#E9E9E9
| 556759 ||  || — || August 27, 2014 || Haleakala || Pan-STARRS ||  || align=right | 1.4 km || 
|-id=760 bgcolor=#E9E9E9
| 556760 ||  || — || October 9, 2010 || Kitt Peak || Spacewatch ||  || align=right data-sort-value="0.77" | 770 m || 
|-id=761 bgcolor=#E9E9E9
| 556761 ||  || — || October 12, 2010 || Mount Lemmon || Mount Lemmon Survey ||  || align=right | 1.4 km || 
|-id=762 bgcolor=#E9E9E9
| 556762 ||  || — || November 11, 2001 || Apache Point || SDSS Collaboration ||  || align=right | 1.5 km || 
|-id=763 bgcolor=#E9E9E9
| 556763 ||  || — || July 28, 2014 || Haleakala || Pan-STARRS ||  || align=right data-sort-value="0.71" | 710 m || 
|-id=764 bgcolor=#E9E9E9
| 556764 ||  || — || August 29, 2014 || Haleakala || Pan-STARRS ||  || align=right | 2.1 km || 
|-id=765 bgcolor=#E9E9E9
| 556765 ||  || — || August 30, 2014 || Haleakala || Pan-STARRS ||  || align=right | 1.3 km || 
|-id=766 bgcolor=#E9E9E9
| 556766 ||  || — || August 31, 2014 || Haleakala || Pan-STARRS ||  || align=right | 1.1 km || 
|-id=767 bgcolor=#E9E9E9
| 556767 ||  || — || May 19, 2013 || Nogales || M. Schwartz, P. R. Holvorcem ||  || align=right | 1.6 km || 
|-id=768 bgcolor=#E9E9E9
| 556768 ||  || — || August 31, 2014 || Haleakala || Pan-STARRS ||  || align=right | 1.9 km || 
|-id=769 bgcolor=#fefefe
| 556769 ||  || — || February 2, 2006 || Mount Lemmon || Mount Lemmon Survey ||  || align=right data-sort-value="0.69" | 690 m || 
|-id=770 bgcolor=#E9E9E9
| 556770 ||  || — || January 10, 2008 || Kitt Peak || Spacewatch ||  || align=right | 1.5 km || 
|-id=771 bgcolor=#fefefe
| 556771 ||  || — || July 1, 2014 || Haleakala || Pan-STARRS ||  || align=right data-sort-value="0.65" | 650 m || 
|-id=772 bgcolor=#E9E9E9
| 556772 ||  || — || May 31, 2014 || Haleakala || Pan-STARRS ||  || align=right data-sort-value="0.89" | 890 m || 
|-id=773 bgcolor=#E9E9E9
| 556773 ||  || — || November 28, 2010 || Mount Lemmon || Mount Lemmon Survey ||  || align=right | 1.8 km || 
|-id=774 bgcolor=#E9E9E9
| 556774 ||  || — || March 23, 2003 || Kitt Peak || Spacewatch ||  || align=right | 1.9 km || 
|-id=775 bgcolor=#fefefe
| 556775 ||  || — || September 10, 2007 || Mount Lemmon || Mount Lemmon Survey ||  || align=right data-sort-value="0.67" | 670 m || 
|-id=776 bgcolor=#E9E9E9
| 556776 ||  || — || March 18, 2004 || Kitt Peak || Spacewatch ||  || align=right | 1.0 km || 
|-id=777 bgcolor=#E9E9E9
| 556777 ||  || — || October 23, 2006 || Mount Lemmon || Mount Lemmon Survey ||  || align=right | 1.4 km || 
|-id=778 bgcolor=#E9E9E9
| 556778 ||  || — || September 17, 2006 || Kitt Peak || Spacewatch ||  || align=right data-sort-value="0.73" | 730 m || 
|-id=779 bgcolor=#E9E9E9
| 556779 ||  || — || September 19, 1998 || Apache Point || SDSS Collaboration ||  || align=right data-sort-value="0.75" | 750 m || 
|-id=780 bgcolor=#E9E9E9
| 556780 ||  || — || February 9, 2008 || Kitt Peak || Spacewatch ||  || align=right data-sort-value="0.78" | 780 m || 
|-id=781 bgcolor=#fefefe
| 556781 ||  || — || March 25, 2006 || Kitt Peak || Spacewatch ||  || align=right data-sort-value="0.64" | 640 m || 
|-id=782 bgcolor=#E9E9E9
| 556782 ||  || — || September 19, 2006 || Kitt Peak || Spacewatch ||  || align=right | 1.7 km || 
|-id=783 bgcolor=#d6d6d6
| 556783 ||  || — || August 22, 2014 || Haleakala || Pan-STARRS ||  || align=right | 2.2 km || 
|-id=784 bgcolor=#E9E9E9
| 556784 ||  || — || March 18, 2004 || Kitt Peak || Spacewatch ||  || align=right | 1.6 km || 
|-id=785 bgcolor=#E9E9E9
| 556785 ||  || — || September 11, 2005 || Kitt Peak || Spacewatch ||  || align=right | 1.5 km || 
|-id=786 bgcolor=#d6d6d6
| 556786 ||  || — || October 26, 2009 || Kitt Peak || Spacewatch ||  || align=right | 1.5 km || 
|-id=787 bgcolor=#E9E9E9
| 556787 ||  || — || August 28, 2014 || Haleakala || Pan-STARRS ||  || align=right | 1.1 km || 
|-id=788 bgcolor=#E9E9E9
| 556788 ||  || — || August 23, 2014 || Haleakala || Pan-STARRS ||  || align=right | 1.4 km || 
|-id=789 bgcolor=#fefefe
| 556789 ||  || — || August 20, 2014 || Haleakala || Pan-STARRS ||  || align=right data-sort-value="0.65" | 650 m || 
|-id=790 bgcolor=#E9E9E9
| 556790 ||  || — || July 31, 2005 || Palomar || NEAT ||  || align=right | 1.2 km || 
|-id=791 bgcolor=#E9E9E9
| 556791 ||  || — || August 31, 2014 || Haleakala || Pan-STARRS ||  || align=right | 1.6 km || 
|-id=792 bgcolor=#fefefe
| 556792 ||  || — || August 31, 2014 || Haleakala || Pan-STARRS || H || align=right data-sort-value="0.48" | 480 m || 
|-id=793 bgcolor=#E9E9E9
| 556793 ||  || — || August 29, 2014 || Mount Lemmon || Mount Lemmon Survey ||  || align=right | 1.2 km || 
|-id=794 bgcolor=#fefefe
| 556794 ||  || — || August 28, 2014 || Haleakala || Pan-STARRS ||  || align=right data-sort-value="0.66" | 660 m || 
|-id=795 bgcolor=#E9E9E9
| 556795 ||  || — || August 22, 2014 || Haleakala || Pan-STARRS ||  || align=right data-sort-value="0.85" | 850 m || 
|-id=796 bgcolor=#E9E9E9
| 556796 ||  || — || August 23, 2014 || Kitt Peak || Pan-STARRS ||  || align=right data-sort-value="0.91" | 910 m || 
|-id=797 bgcolor=#E9E9E9
| 556797 ||  || — || August 28, 2014 || Haleakala || Pan-STARRS ||  || align=right | 1.2 km || 
|-id=798 bgcolor=#E9E9E9
| 556798 ||  || — || January 14, 2011 || Mount Lemmon || Mount Lemmon Survey ||  || align=right | 1.6 km || 
|-id=799 bgcolor=#E9E9E9
| 556799 ||  || — || August 19, 2014 || Haleakala || Pan-STARRS ||  || align=right data-sort-value="0.99" | 990 m || 
|-id=800 bgcolor=#E9E9E9
| 556800 ||  || — || February 12, 2008 || Mount Lemmon || Mount Lemmon Survey ||  || align=right | 1.1 km || 
|}

556801–556900 

|-bgcolor=#E9E9E9
| 556801 ||  || — || August 22, 2014 || Haleakala || Pan-STARRS ||  || align=right | 1.3 km || 
|-id=802 bgcolor=#E9E9E9
| 556802 ||  || — || August 23, 2014 || Haleakala || Pan-STARRS ||  || align=right | 1.3 km || 
|-id=803 bgcolor=#d6d6d6
| 556803 ||  || — || August 25, 2014 || Haleakala || Pan-STARRS ||  || align=right | 2.4 km || 
|-id=804 bgcolor=#d6d6d6
| 556804 ||  || — || August 28, 2014 || Haleakala || Pan-STARRS ||  || align=right | 2.3 km || 
|-id=805 bgcolor=#d6d6d6
| 556805 ||  || — || August 28, 2014 || Haleakala || Pan-STARRS ||  || align=right | 1.9 km || 
|-id=806 bgcolor=#d6d6d6
| 556806 ||  || — || August 28, 2014 || Haleakala || Pan-STARRS ||  || align=right | 2.3 km || 
|-id=807 bgcolor=#E9E9E9
| 556807 ||  || — || September 14, 2010 || Mount Lemmon || Mount Lemmon Survey ||  || align=right data-sort-value="0.86" | 860 m || 
|-id=808 bgcolor=#E9E9E9
| 556808 ||  || — || September 11, 2005 || Kitt Peak || Spacewatch ||  || align=right | 1.8 km || 
|-id=809 bgcolor=#E9E9E9
| 556809 ||  || — || July 29, 2014 || Haleakala || Pan-STARRS ||  || align=right | 2.0 km || 
|-id=810 bgcolor=#E9E9E9
| 556810 ||  || — || March 14, 2004 || Kitt Peak || Spacewatch ||  || align=right | 1.8 km || 
|-id=811 bgcolor=#fefefe
| 556811 ||  || — || February 2, 2000 || Kitt Peak || Spacewatch || H || align=right data-sort-value="0.65" | 650 m || 
|-id=812 bgcolor=#E9E9E9
| 556812 ||  || — || June 2, 2013 || Nogales || M. Schwartz, P. R. Holvorcem ||  || align=right | 3.8 km || 
|-id=813 bgcolor=#fefefe
| 556813 ||  || — || August 20, 2006 || Palomar || NEAT || H || align=right data-sort-value="0.59" | 590 m || 
|-id=814 bgcolor=#fefefe
| 556814 ||  || — || September 11, 2014 || Haleakala || Pan-STARRS || H || align=right data-sort-value="0.76" | 760 m || 
|-id=815 bgcolor=#E9E9E9
| 556815 ||  || — || October 29, 2010 || Catalina || CSS ||  || align=right | 1.5 km || 
|-id=816 bgcolor=#E9E9E9
| 556816 ||  || — || September 17, 2006 || Kitt Peak || Spacewatch ||  || align=right data-sort-value="0.94" | 940 m || 
|-id=817 bgcolor=#E9E9E9
| 556817 ||  || — || September 6, 2010 || Mount Lemmon || Mount Lemmon Survey ||  || align=right data-sort-value="0.87" | 870 m || 
|-id=818 bgcolor=#fefefe
| 556818 ||  || — || March 15, 2013 || Kitt Peak || Spacewatch ||  || align=right data-sort-value="0.79" | 790 m || 
|-id=819 bgcolor=#fefefe
| 556819 ||  || — || September 18, 1995 || Kitt Peak || Spacewatch ||  || align=right data-sort-value="0.62" | 620 m || 
|-id=820 bgcolor=#FA8072
| 556820 ||  || — || April 3, 2011 || Haleakala || Pan-STARRS || H || align=right data-sort-value="0.46" | 460 m || 
|-id=821 bgcolor=#E9E9E9
| 556821 ||  || — || March 6, 2008 || Mount Lemmon || Mount Lemmon Survey ||  || align=right | 1.1 km || 
|-id=822 bgcolor=#fefefe
| 556822 ||  || — || August 4, 2014 || Haleakala || Pan-STARRS ||  || align=right data-sort-value="0.63" | 630 m || 
|-id=823 bgcolor=#E9E9E9
| 556823 ||  || — || February 2, 2008 || Mount Lemmon || Mount Lemmon Survey ||  || align=right | 1.9 km || 
|-id=824 bgcolor=#E9E9E9
| 556824 ||  || — || September 18, 2010 || Kitt Peak || Spacewatch ||  || align=right data-sort-value="0.81" | 810 m || 
|-id=825 bgcolor=#E9E9E9
| 556825 ||  || — || February 3, 2002 || Palomar || NEAT ||  || align=right | 2.3 km || 
|-id=826 bgcolor=#fefefe
| 556826 ||  || — || August 26, 2014 || ESA OGS || ESA OGS ||  || align=right data-sort-value="0.86" | 860 m || 
|-id=827 bgcolor=#E9E9E9
| 556827 ||  || — || October 29, 2010 || Catalina || CSS ||  || align=right data-sort-value="0.97" | 970 m || 
|-id=828 bgcolor=#d6d6d6
| 556828 ||  || — || October 29, 2003 || Socorro || LINEAR ||  || align=right | 2.2 km || 
|-id=829 bgcolor=#fefefe
| 556829 ||  || — || June 13, 2010 || Mount Lemmon || Mount Lemmon Survey ||  || align=right data-sort-value="0.76" | 760 m || 
|-id=830 bgcolor=#E9E9E9
| 556830 ||  || — || September 14, 2014 || Kitt Peak || Spacewatch ||  || align=right data-sort-value="0.83" | 830 m || 
|-id=831 bgcolor=#E9E9E9
| 556831 ||  || — || March 12, 2008 || Kitt Peak || Mount Lemmon Survey ||  || align=right | 1.1 km || 
|-id=832 bgcolor=#E9E9E9
| 556832 ||  || — || February 10, 2008 || Mount Lemmon || Mount Lemmon Survey ||  || align=right | 1.4 km || 
|-id=833 bgcolor=#E9E9E9
| 556833 ||  || — || August 27, 2006 || Kitt Peak || Spacewatch ||  || align=right data-sort-value="0.77" | 770 m || 
|-id=834 bgcolor=#E9E9E9
| 556834 ||  || — || March 28, 2012 || Mount Lemmon || Mount Lemmon Survey ||  || align=right | 1.7 km || 
|-id=835 bgcolor=#E9E9E9
| 556835 ||  || — || April 1, 2008 || Kitt Peak || Spacewatch ||  || align=right | 1.9 km || 
|-id=836 bgcolor=#E9E9E9
| 556836 ||  || — || January 11, 2003 || Kitt Peak || Spacewatch ||  || align=right | 1.9 km || 
|-id=837 bgcolor=#E9E9E9
| 556837 ||  || — || November 6, 2010 || Catalina || CSS ||  || align=right | 2.2 km || 
|-id=838 bgcolor=#fefefe
| 556838 ||  || — || September 2, 2014 || Haleakala || Pan-STARRS || H || align=right data-sort-value="0.60" | 600 m || 
|-id=839 bgcolor=#E9E9E9
| 556839 ||  || — || August 16, 2009 || La Sagra || OAM Obs. ||  || align=right | 2.0 km || 
|-id=840 bgcolor=#E9E9E9
| 556840 ||  || — || August 31, 2014 || Catalina || CSS ||  || align=right | 1.1 km || 
|-id=841 bgcolor=#E9E9E9
| 556841 ||  || — || April 9, 2008 || Mount Lemmon || Mount Lemmon Survey ||  || align=right | 1.3 km || 
|-id=842 bgcolor=#E9E9E9
| 556842 ||  || — || September 2, 2014 || Haleakala || Pan-STARRS ||  || align=right | 1.4 km || 
|-id=843 bgcolor=#E9E9E9
| 556843 ||  || — || September 2, 2014 || Haleakala || Pan-STARRS ||  || align=right | 1.1 km || 
|-id=844 bgcolor=#E9E9E9
| 556844 ||  || — || December 27, 2011 || Mount Lemmon || Mount Lemmon Survey ||  || align=right | 1.5 km || 
|-id=845 bgcolor=#E9E9E9
| 556845 ||  || — || July 13, 2009 || Kitt Peak || Spacewatch ||  || align=right | 1.2 km || 
|-id=846 bgcolor=#d6d6d6
| 556846 ||  || — || December 21, 2005 || Kitt Peak || Spacewatch ||  || align=right | 2.6 km || 
|-id=847 bgcolor=#E9E9E9
| 556847 ||  || — || September 14, 2014 || Kitt Peak || Spacewatch ||  || align=right | 2.0 km || 
|-id=848 bgcolor=#E9E9E9
| 556848 ||  || — || September 4, 2014 || Haleakala || Pan-STARRS ||  || align=right | 1.2 km || 
|-id=849 bgcolor=#E9E9E9
| 556849 ||  || — || February 11, 2016 || Haleakala || Pan-STARRS ||  || align=right | 1.1 km || 
|-id=850 bgcolor=#fefefe
| 556850 ||  || — || September 2, 2014 || Haleakala || Pan-STARRS ||  || align=right data-sort-value="0.63" | 630 m || 
|-id=851 bgcolor=#E9E9E9
| 556851 ||  || — || September 4, 2014 || Haleakala || Pan-STARRS ||  || align=right data-sort-value="0.96" | 960 m || 
|-id=852 bgcolor=#d6d6d6
| 556852 ||  || — || September 4, 2014 || Haleakala || Pan-STARRS ||  || align=right | 2.3 km || 
|-id=853 bgcolor=#d6d6d6
| 556853 ||  || — || September 2, 2014 || Haleakala || Pan-STARRS ||  || align=right | 1.7 km || 
|-id=854 bgcolor=#fefefe
| 556854 ||  || — || July 30, 2014 || Haleakala || Pan-STARRS || H || align=right data-sort-value="0.46" | 460 m || 
|-id=855 bgcolor=#d6d6d6
| 556855 ||  || — || September 28, 2003 || Anderson Mesa || LONEOS ||  || align=right | 2.6 km || 
|-id=856 bgcolor=#E9E9E9
| 556856 ||  || — || March 31, 2008 || Kitt Peak || Spacewatch ||  || align=right | 1.4 km || 
|-id=857 bgcolor=#E9E9E9
| 556857 ||  || — || August 20, 2014 || Haleakala || Pan-STARRS ||  || align=right data-sort-value="0.73" | 730 m || 
|-id=858 bgcolor=#E9E9E9
| 556858 ||  || — || September 16, 2010 || Kitt Peak || Spacewatch ||  || align=right data-sort-value="0.87" | 870 m || 
|-id=859 bgcolor=#E9E9E9
| 556859 ||  || — || October 17, 2010 || Mount Lemmon || Mount Lemmon Survey ||  || align=right | 1.1 km || 
|-id=860 bgcolor=#E9E9E9
| 556860 ||  || — || April 10, 2013 || Mount Lemmon || Mount Lemmon Survey ||  || align=right data-sort-value="0.92" | 920 m || 
|-id=861 bgcolor=#E9E9E9
| 556861 ||  || — || August 19, 2014 || Haleakala || Pan-STARRS ||  || align=right | 1.2 km || 
|-id=862 bgcolor=#E9E9E9
| 556862 ||  || — || August 20, 2014 || Haleakala || Pan-STARRS ||  || align=right | 1.1 km || 
|-id=863 bgcolor=#E9E9E9
| 556863 ||  || — || October 11, 2010 || Bergisch Gladbach || W. Bickel ||  || align=right | 1.2 km || 
|-id=864 bgcolor=#E9E9E9
| 556864 ||  || — || March 9, 2007 || Kitt Peak || Spacewatch ||  || align=right | 2.1 km || 
|-id=865 bgcolor=#E9E9E9
| 556865 ||  || — || September 26, 2006 || Mount Lemmon || Mount Lemmon Survey ||  || align=right data-sort-value="0.75" | 750 m || 
|-id=866 bgcolor=#E9E9E9
| 556866 ||  || — || October 12, 2010 || Mount Lemmon || Mount Lemmon Survey ||  || align=right | 1.2 km || 
|-id=867 bgcolor=#E9E9E9
| 556867 ||  || — || April 12, 2013 || Haleakala || Pan-STARRS ||  || align=right | 1.1 km || 
|-id=868 bgcolor=#E9E9E9
| 556868 ||  || — || April 30, 2013 || Kitt Peak || Spacewatch ||  || align=right | 1.0 km || 
|-id=869 bgcolor=#E9E9E9
| 556869 ||  || — || August 20, 2014 || Haleakala || Pan-STARRS ||  || align=right data-sort-value="0.63" | 630 m || 
|-id=870 bgcolor=#E9E9E9
| 556870 ||  || — || January 10, 2007 || Mount Lemmon || Mount Lemmon Survey ||  || align=right | 1.7 km || 
|-id=871 bgcolor=#E9E9E9
| 556871 ||  || — || February 28, 2012 || Haleakala || Pan-STARRS ||  || align=right | 1.1 km || 
|-id=872 bgcolor=#fefefe
| 556872 ||  || — || June 26, 2014 || Haleakala || Pan-STARRS ||  || align=right data-sort-value="0.70" | 700 m || 
|-id=873 bgcolor=#E9E9E9
| 556873 ||  || — || July 7, 2014 || Haleakala || Pan-STARRS ||  || align=right data-sort-value="0.74" | 740 m || 
|-id=874 bgcolor=#E9E9E9
| 556874 ||  || — || January 27, 2012 || Kitt Peak || Spacewatch ||  || align=right | 2.0 km || 
|-id=875 bgcolor=#E9E9E9
| 556875 ||  || — || February 12, 2008 || Mount Lemmon || Mount Lemmon Survey ||  || align=right | 2.2 km || 
|-id=876 bgcolor=#d6d6d6
| 556876 ||  || — || August 28, 2014 || Haleakala || Pan-STARRS ||  || align=right | 1.9 km || 
|-id=877 bgcolor=#E9E9E9
| 556877 ||  || — || November 12, 2010 || Mount Lemmon || Mount Lemmon Survey ||  || align=right | 1.6 km || 
|-id=878 bgcolor=#E9E9E9
| 556878 ||  || — || September 17, 2014 || Haleakala || Pan-STARRS ||  || align=right | 1.5 km || 
|-id=879 bgcolor=#E9E9E9
| 556879 ||  || — || August 27, 2014 || Mount Lemmon || Pan-STARRS ||  || align=right data-sort-value="0.79" | 790 m || 
|-id=880 bgcolor=#E9E9E9
| 556880 ||  || — || July 31, 2014 || Haleakala || Pan-STARRS ||  || align=right | 1.1 km || 
|-id=881 bgcolor=#E9E9E9
| 556881 ||  || — || April 6, 2013 || Mount Lemmon || Mount Lemmon Survey ||  || align=right data-sort-value="0.88" | 880 m || 
|-id=882 bgcolor=#E9E9E9
| 556882 ||  || — || July 7, 2014 || Haleakala || Pan-STARRS ||  || align=right data-sort-value="0.92" | 920 m || 
|-id=883 bgcolor=#E9E9E9
| 556883 ||  || — || May 29, 2009 || Mount Lemmon || Mount Lemmon Survey ||  || align=right data-sort-value="0.88" | 880 m || 
|-id=884 bgcolor=#fefefe
| 556884 ||  || — || July 28, 2014 || Haleakala || Pan-STARRS ||  || align=right data-sort-value="0.74" | 740 m || 
|-id=885 bgcolor=#E9E9E9
| 556885 ||  || — || January 28, 2004 || Kitt Peak || Spacewatch ||  || align=right data-sort-value="0.86" | 860 m || 
|-id=886 bgcolor=#E9E9E9
| 556886 ||  || — || March 23, 2013 || Mount Lemmon || Mount Lemmon Survey ||  || align=right data-sort-value="0.81" | 810 m || 
|-id=887 bgcolor=#E9E9E9
| 556887 ||  || — || July 25, 2014 || Haleakala || Pan-STARRS ||  || align=right | 1.4 km || 
|-id=888 bgcolor=#E9E9E9
| 556888 ||  || — || August 28, 2014 || Haleakala || Pan-STARRS ||  || align=right data-sort-value="0.95" | 950 m || 
|-id=889 bgcolor=#E9E9E9
| 556889 ||  || — || April 17, 2013 || Haleakala || Pan-STARRS ||  || align=right | 1.9 km || 
|-id=890 bgcolor=#E9E9E9
| 556890 ||  || — || November 18, 2006 || Kitt Peak || Spacewatch ||  || align=right | 2.1 km || 
|-id=891 bgcolor=#E9E9E9
| 556891 ||  || — || August 28, 2014 || Haleakala || Pan-STARRS ||  || align=right | 1.1 km || 
|-id=892 bgcolor=#E9E9E9
| 556892 ||  || — || January 2, 2012 || Mount Lemmon || Mount Lemmon Survey ||  || align=right | 1.2 km || 
|-id=893 bgcolor=#d6d6d6
| 556893 ||  || — || July 25, 2014 || Haleakala || Pan-STARRS ||  || align=right | 2.2 km || 
|-id=894 bgcolor=#d6d6d6
| 556894 ||  || — || January 17, 2011 || Mount Lemmon || Mount Lemmon Survey ||  || align=right | 2.1 km || 
|-id=895 bgcolor=#E9E9E9
| 556895 ||  || — || January 27, 2012 || Kitt Peak || Spacewatch ||  || align=right data-sort-value="0.80" | 800 m || 
|-id=896 bgcolor=#d6d6d6
| 556896 ||  || — || September 27, 2009 || Mount Lemmon || Mount Lemmon Survey ||  || align=right | 1.7 km || 
|-id=897 bgcolor=#E9E9E9
| 556897 ||  || — || October 23, 2011 || Haleakala || Pan-STARRS ||  || align=right | 1.0 km || 
|-id=898 bgcolor=#fefefe
| 556898 ||  || — || March 2, 2009 || Mount Lemmon || Mount Lemmon Survey ||  || align=right data-sort-value="0.87" | 870 m || 
|-id=899 bgcolor=#E9E9E9
| 556899 ||  || — || August 27, 2014 || Haleakala || Pan-STARRS ||  || align=right | 1.5 km || 
|-id=900 bgcolor=#E9E9E9
| 556900 ||  || — || September 1, 2005 || Kitt Peak || Spacewatch ||  || align=right | 1.4 km || 
|}

556901–557000 

|-bgcolor=#E9E9E9
| 556901 ||  || — || October 3, 2010 || Kitt Peak || Spacewatch ||  || align=right data-sort-value="0.75" | 750 m || 
|-id=902 bgcolor=#E9E9E9
| 556902 ||  || — || September 14, 2006 || Kitt Peak || Spacewatch ||  || align=right data-sort-value="0.71" | 710 m || 
|-id=903 bgcolor=#E9E9E9
| 556903 ||  || — || March 2, 2008 || Kitt Peak || Spacewatch ||  || align=right | 1.3 km || 
|-id=904 bgcolor=#E9E9E9
| 556904 ||  || — || August 27, 2014 || Kitt Peak || Pan-STARRS ||  || align=right | 1.0 km || 
|-id=905 bgcolor=#E9E9E9
| 556905 ||  || — || January 15, 2008 || Kitt Peak || Spacewatch ||  || align=right data-sort-value="0.75" | 750 m || 
|-id=906 bgcolor=#E9E9E9
| 556906 ||  || — || August 27, 2014 || Haleakala || Pan-STARRS ||  || align=right | 1.3 km || 
|-id=907 bgcolor=#E9E9E9
| 556907 ||  || — || January 19, 2012 || Haleakala || Pan-STARRS ||  || align=right data-sort-value="0.66" | 660 m || 
|-id=908 bgcolor=#E9E9E9
| 556908 ||  || — || September 18, 2014 || Haleakala || Pan-STARRS ||  || align=right data-sort-value="0.68" | 680 m || 
|-id=909 bgcolor=#E9E9E9
| 556909 ||  || — || September 18, 2014 || Haleakala || Pan-STARRS ||  || align=right | 1.5 km || 
|-id=910 bgcolor=#E9E9E9
| 556910 ||  || — || March 25, 2003 || Kitt Peak || Spacewatch ||  || align=right | 1.0 km || 
|-id=911 bgcolor=#E9E9E9
| 556911 ||  || — || June 4, 2013 || Mount Lemmon || Mount Lemmon Survey ||  || align=right data-sort-value="0.86" | 860 m || 
|-id=912 bgcolor=#d6d6d6
| 556912 ||  || — || September 15, 2009 || Kitt Peak || Spacewatch ||  || align=right | 1.7 km || 
|-id=913 bgcolor=#E9E9E9
| 556913 ||  || — || November 13, 2010 || Mount Lemmon || Mount Lemmon Survey ||  || align=right | 1.2 km || 
|-id=914 bgcolor=#E9E9E9
| 556914 ||  || — || November 6, 2010 || Mount Lemmon || Mount Lemmon Survey ||  || align=right | 1.1 km || 
|-id=915 bgcolor=#E9E9E9
| 556915 ||  || — || April 1, 2008 || Kitt Peak || Spacewatch ||  || align=right | 1.4 km || 
|-id=916 bgcolor=#E9E9E9
| 556916 ||  || — || December 16, 2006 || Mount Lemmon || Mount Lemmon Survey ||  || align=right | 1.1 km || 
|-id=917 bgcolor=#E9E9E9
| 556917 ||  || — || February 1, 2008 || Kitt Peak || Spacewatch ||  || align=right data-sort-value="0.91" | 910 m || 
|-id=918 bgcolor=#E9E9E9
| 556918 ||  || — || August 30, 2005 || Kitt Peak || Spacewatch ||  || align=right | 1.7 km || 
|-id=919 bgcolor=#fefefe
| 556919 ||  || — || January 31, 2009 || Kitt Peak || Spacewatch ||  || align=right data-sort-value="0.68" | 680 m || 
|-id=920 bgcolor=#E9E9E9
| 556920 ||  || — || October 8, 2010 || Kitt Peak || Spacewatch ||  || align=right data-sort-value="0.83" | 830 m || 
|-id=921 bgcolor=#E9E9E9
| 556921 ||  || — || March 16, 2012 || Mount Lemmon || Mount Lemmon Survey ||  || align=right | 1.2 km || 
|-id=922 bgcolor=#E9E9E9
| 556922 ||  || — || April 12, 2005 || Kitt Peak || Kitt Peak Obs. ||  || align=right data-sort-value="0.70" | 700 m || 
|-id=923 bgcolor=#E9E9E9
| 556923 ||  || — || April 19, 2013 || Haleakala || Pan-STARRS ||  || align=right | 1.4 km || 
|-id=924 bgcolor=#E9E9E9
| 556924 ||  || — || December 26, 2006 || Kitt Peak || Spacewatch ||  || align=right | 1.4 km || 
|-id=925 bgcolor=#E9E9E9
| 556925 ||  || — || October 9, 2010 || Mount Lemmon || Mount Lemmon Survey ||  || align=right data-sort-value="0.79" | 790 m || 
|-id=926 bgcolor=#E9E9E9
| 556926 ||  || — || May 28, 2009 || Mount Lemmon || Mount Lemmon Survey ||  || align=right data-sort-value="0.80" | 800 m || 
|-id=927 bgcolor=#E9E9E9
| 556927 ||  || — || July 30, 2014 || Haleakala || Pan-STARRS ||  || align=right data-sort-value="0.72" | 720 m || 
|-id=928 bgcolor=#E9E9E9
| 556928 ||  || — || October 20, 2006 || Mount Lemmon || Mount Lemmon Survey ||  || align=right data-sort-value="0.92" | 920 m || 
|-id=929 bgcolor=#FA8072
| 556929 ||  || — || March 13, 2010 || Mount Lemmon || Mount Lemmon Survey || H || align=right data-sort-value="0.65" | 650 m || 
|-id=930 bgcolor=#fefefe
| 556930 ||  || — || December 13, 2012 || Mount Lemmon || Mount Lemmon Survey || H || align=right data-sort-value="0.60" | 600 m || 
|-id=931 bgcolor=#fefefe
| 556931 ||  || — || April 14, 2011 || Mount Lemmon || Mount Lemmon Survey || H || align=right data-sort-value="0.65" | 650 m || 
|-id=932 bgcolor=#E9E9E9
| 556932 ||  || — || January 4, 2012 || Mount Lemmon || Mount Lemmon Survey ||  || align=right data-sort-value="0.88" | 880 m || 
|-id=933 bgcolor=#E9E9E9
| 556933 ||  || — || April 27, 2012 || Haleakala || Pan-STARRS ||  || align=right | 2.4 km || 
|-id=934 bgcolor=#fefefe
| 556934 ||  || — || March 6, 2008 || Catalina || CSS || H || align=right data-sort-value="0.60" | 600 m || 
|-id=935 bgcolor=#fefefe
| 556935 ||  || — || July 7, 2014 || Haleakala || Pan-STARRS ||  || align=right data-sort-value="0.72" | 720 m || 
|-id=936 bgcolor=#E9E9E9
| 556936 ||  || — || April 29, 2000 || Socorro || LINEAR ||  || align=right | 1.6 km || 
|-id=937 bgcolor=#E9E9E9
| 556937 ||  || — || September 28, 2001 || Palomar || NEAT ||  || align=right | 1.6 km || 
|-id=938 bgcolor=#fefefe
| 556938 ||  || — || May 26, 2006 || Mount Lemmon || Mount Lemmon Survey ||  || align=right data-sort-value="0.69" | 690 m || 
|-id=939 bgcolor=#fefefe
| 556939 ||  || — || September 27, 2006 || Kitt Peak || Spacewatch || H || align=right data-sort-value="0.57" | 570 m || 
|-id=940 bgcolor=#E9E9E9
| 556940 ||  || — || April 14, 2012 || Haleakala || Pan-STARRS ||  || align=right | 1.5 km || 
|-id=941 bgcolor=#E9E9E9
| 556941 ||  || — || November 10, 2010 || Kitt Peak || Spacewatch ||  || align=right | 1.5 km || 
|-id=942 bgcolor=#E9E9E9
| 556942 ||  || — || September 26, 2005 || Kitt Peak || Spacewatch ||  || align=right | 1.5 km || 
|-id=943 bgcolor=#E9E9E9
| 556943 ||  || — || October 17, 2010 || Mount Lemmon || Mount Lemmon Survey ||  || align=right data-sort-value="0.83" | 830 m || 
|-id=944 bgcolor=#E9E9E9
| 556944 ||  || — || November 1, 2010 || Mount Lemmon || Mount Lemmon Survey ||  || align=right data-sort-value="0.73" | 730 m || 
|-id=945 bgcolor=#fefefe
| 556945 ||  || — || October 4, 2000 || Kitt Peak || Spacewatch ||  || align=right data-sort-value="0.50" | 500 m || 
|-id=946 bgcolor=#E9E9E9
| 556946 ||  || — || September 14, 2014 || Kitt Peak || Spacewatch ||  || align=right | 1.7 km || 
|-id=947 bgcolor=#E9E9E9
| 556947 ||  || — || October 6, 2005 || Mount Lemmon || Mount Lemmon Survey ||  || align=right | 1.2 km || 
|-id=948 bgcolor=#E9E9E9
| 556948 ||  || — || November 19, 2006 || Kitt Peak || Spacewatch ||  || align=right data-sort-value="0.84" | 840 m || 
|-id=949 bgcolor=#E9E9E9
| 556949 ||  || — || November 13, 2010 || Kitt Peak || Spacewatch ||  || align=right | 1.0 km || 
|-id=950 bgcolor=#E9E9E9
| 556950 ||  || — || November 13, 2010 || Mount Lemmon || Mount Lemmon Survey ||  || align=right | 1.3 km || 
|-id=951 bgcolor=#E9E9E9
| 556951 ||  || — || November 7, 2010 || Mount Lemmon || Mount Lemmon Survey ||  || align=right | 1.3 km || 
|-id=952 bgcolor=#E9E9E9
| 556952 ||  || — || October 28, 2010 || Mount Lemmon || Mount Lemmon Survey ||  || align=right | 1.3 km || 
|-id=953 bgcolor=#E9E9E9
| 556953 ||  || — || September 19, 2014 || Haleakala || Pan-STARRS ||  || align=right | 1.4 km || 
|-id=954 bgcolor=#E9E9E9
| 556954 ||  || — || September 2, 2014 || Catalina || CSS ||  || align=right data-sort-value="0.89" | 890 m || 
|-id=955 bgcolor=#fefefe
| 556955 ||  || — || July 30, 2014 || Haleakala || Pan-STARRS ||  || align=right data-sort-value="0.63" | 630 m || 
|-id=956 bgcolor=#E9E9E9
| 556956 ||  || — || September 21, 2010 || Bergisch Gladbach || W. Bickel ||  || align=right | 1.1 km || 
|-id=957 bgcolor=#E9E9E9
| 556957 ||  || — || December 18, 2007 || Mount Lemmon || Mount Lemmon Survey ||  || align=right | 1.5 km || 
|-id=958 bgcolor=#E9E9E9
| 556958 ||  || — || April 16, 2013 || Haleakala || Pan-STARRS ||  || align=right data-sort-value="0.87" | 870 m || 
|-id=959 bgcolor=#E9E9E9
| 556959 ||  || — || November 23, 2006 || Kitt Peak || Spacewatch ||  || align=right | 1.3 km || 
|-id=960 bgcolor=#E9E9E9
| 556960 ||  || — || October 29, 2010 || Kitt Peak || Spacewatch ||  || align=right | 1.3 km || 
|-id=961 bgcolor=#E9E9E9
| 556961 ||  || — || November 3, 2010 || Mount Lemmon || Mount Lemmon Survey ||  || align=right | 1.3 km || 
|-id=962 bgcolor=#d6d6d6
| 556962 ||  || — || March 22, 2012 || Mount Lemmon || Mount Lemmon Survey ||  || align=right | 2.0 km || 
|-id=963 bgcolor=#E9E9E9
| 556963 ||  || — || October 17, 2010 || Mount Lemmon || Mount Lemmon Survey ||  || align=right | 1.5 km || 
|-id=964 bgcolor=#E9E9E9
| 556964 ||  || — || August 27, 2014 || Haleakala || Pan-STARRS ||  || align=right | 1.6 km || 
|-id=965 bgcolor=#E9E9E9
| 556965 ||  || — || August 27, 2014 || Haleakala || Pan-STARRS ||  || align=right | 1.1 km || 
|-id=966 bgcolor=#d6d6d6
| 556966 ||  || — || March 28, 2012 || Mount Lemmon || Mount Lemmon Survey ||  || align=right | 2.3 km || 
|-id=967 bgcolor=#E9E9E9
| 556967 ||  || — || November 8, 2010 || Mount Lemmon || Mount Lemmon Survey ||  || align=right | 1.1 km || 
|-id=968 bgcolor=#E9E9E9
| 556968 ||  || — || December 29, 2011 || Kitt Peak || Spacewatch ||  || align=right data-sort-value="0.85" | 850 m || 
|-id=969 bgcolor=#E9E9E9
| 556969 ||  || — || February 1, 2008 || Kitt Peak || Spacewatch ||  || align=right | 1.6 km || 
|-id=970 bgcolor=#E9E9E9
| 556970 ||  || — || October 23, 2006 || Mount Lemmon || Mount Lemmon Survey ||  || align=right | 1.2 km || 
|-id=971 bgcolor=#E9E9E9
| 556971 ||  || — || August 31, 2014 || Haleakala || Pan-STARRS ||  || align=right | 1.0 km || 
|-id=972 bgcolor=#E9E9E9
| 556972 ||  || — || February 5, 2011 || Haleakala || Pan-STARRS || DOR || align=right | 1.6 km || 
|-id=973 bgcolor=#E9E9E9
| 556973 ||  || — || September 4, 2014 || Haleakala || Pan-STARRS ||  || align=right | 2.0 km || 
|-id=974 bgcolor=#E9E9E9
| 556974 ||  || — || December 14, 2010 || Mount Lemmon || Mount Lemmon Survey ||  || align=right | 1.6 km || 
|-id=975 bgcolor=#d6d6d6
| 556975 ||  || — || January 19, 2005 || Kitt Peak || Spacewatch || HYG || align=right | 2.7 km || 
|-id=976 bgcolor=#E9E9E9
| 556976 ||  || — || December 14, 2010 || Mount Lemmon || Mount Lemmon Survey ||  || align=right | 1.3 km || 
|-id=977 bgcolor=#E9E9E9
| 556977 ||  || — || January 10, 2006 || Kitt Peak || Spacewatch ||  || align=right | 1.9 km || 
|-id=978 bgcolor=#E9E9E9
| 556978 ||  || — || January 14, 2011 || Mount Lemmon || Mount Lemmon Survey ||  || align=right | 1.9 km || 
|-id=979 bgcolor=#d6d6d6
| 556979 ||  || — || September 20, 2014 || Haleakala || Pan-STARRS ||  || align=right | 1.9 km || 
|-id=980 bgcolor=#E9E9E9
| 556980 ||  || — || September 20, 2014 || Haleakala || Pan-STARRS ||  || align=right | 1.2 km || 
|-id=981 bgcolor=#E9E9E9
| 556981 ||  || — || September 20, 2014 || Haleakala || Pan-STARRS ||  || align=right | 2.0 km || 
|-id=982 bgcolor=#E9E9E9
| 556982 ||  || — || May 28, 2014 || Haleakala || Pan-STARRS ||  || align=right | 2.3 km || 
|-id=983 bgcolor=#E9E9E9
| 556983 ||  || — || October 14, 2010 || Mount Lemmon || Mount Lemmon Survey ||  || align=right | 2.2 km || 
|-id=984 bgcolor=#d6d6d6
| 556984 ||  || — || August 28, 2014 || Haleakala || Pan-STARRS ||  || align=right | 2.8 km || 
|-id=985 bgcolor=#d6d6d6
| 556985 ||  || — || March 28, 2012 || Kitt Peak || Spacewatch ||  || align=right | 2.3 km || 
|-id=986 bgcolor=#E9E9E9
| 556986 ||  || — || November 1, 2005 || Kitt Peak || Spacewatch ||  || align=right | 1.8 km || 
|-id=987 bgcolor=#E9E9E9
| 556987 ||  || — || September 7, 2014 || Haleakala || Pan-STARRS ||  || align=right | 2.0 km || 
|-id=988 bgcolor=#E9E9E9
| 556988 ||  || — || January 27, 2007 || Mount Lemmon || Mount Lemmon Survey ||  || align=right | 2.3 km || 
|-id=989 bgcolor=#E9E9E9
| 556989 ||  || — || September 19, 2014 || Haleakala || Pan-STARRS ||  || align=right data-sort-value="0.79" | 790 m || 
|-id=990 bgcolor=#E9E9E9
| 556990 ||  || — || March 27, 2008 || Mount Lemmon || Mount Lemmon Survey ||  || align=right | 1.2 km || 
|-id=991 bgcolor=#E9E9E9
| 556991 ||  || — || October 15, 2001 || Anderson Mesa || SDSS ||  || align=right | 2.1 km || 
|-id=992 bgcolor=#E9E9E9
| 556992 ||  || — || March 10, 2008 || Kitt Peak || Spacewatch ||  || align=right | 1.2 km || 
|-id=993 bgcolor=#E9E9E9
| 556993 ||  || — || June 22, 2014 || Mount Lemmon || Mount Lemmon Survey ||  || align=right | 1.2 km || 
|-id=994 bgcolor=#fefefe
| 556994 ||  || — || November 18, 2007 || Mount Lemmon || Mount Lemmon Survey ||  || align=right data-sort-value="0.80" | 800 m || 
|-id=995 bgcolor=#E9E9E9
| 556995 ||  || — || August 27, 2014 || Haleakala || Pan-STARRS ||  || align=right data-sort-value="0.98" | 980 m || 
|-id=996 bgcolor=#E9E9E9
| 556996 ||  || — || May 30, 2013 || Kitt Peak || Spacewatch ||  || align=right data-sort-value="0.93" | 930 m || 
|-id=997 bgcolor=#E9E9E9
| 556997 ||  || — || January 16, 2003 || Palomar || NEAT ||  || align=right | 1.5 km || 
|-id=998 bgcolor=#E9E9E9
| 556998 ||  || — || December 28, 2011 || Mount Lemmon || Mount Lemmon Survey ||  || align=right | 2.4 km || 
|-id=999 bgcolor=#E9E9E9
| 556999 ||  || — || September 22, 2014 || Haleakala || Pan-STARRS ||  || align=right | 2.1 km || 
|-id=000 bgcolor=#E9E9E9
| 557000 ||  || — || October 12, 2010 || Mount Lemmon || Mount Lemmon Survey ||  || align=right | 2.1 km || 
|}

References

External links 
 Discovery Circumstances: Numbered Minor Planets (555001)–(560000) (IAU Minor Planet Center)

0556